= Art Nouveau glass =

Fine glass in the Art Nouveau style

Art Nouveau glass art
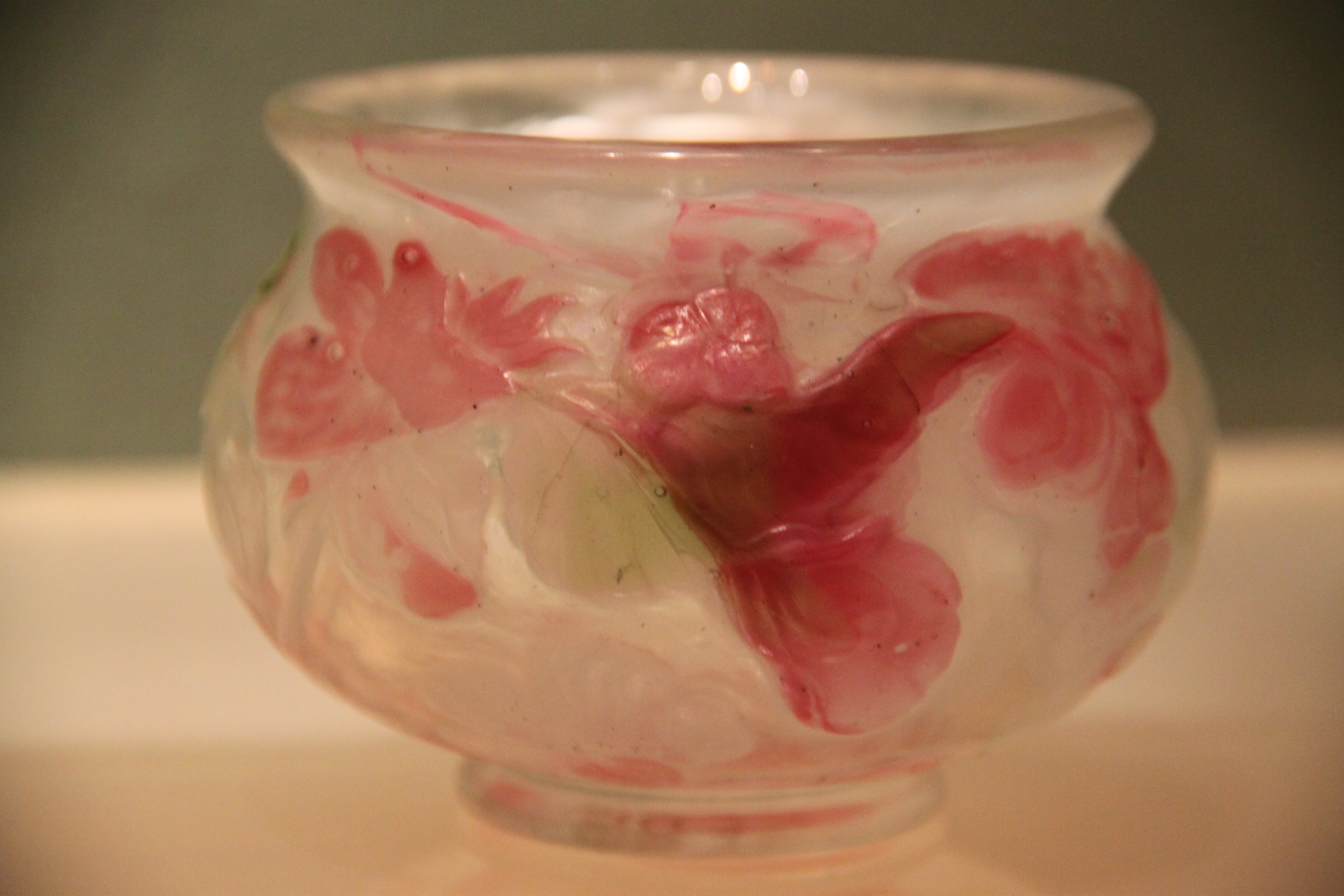
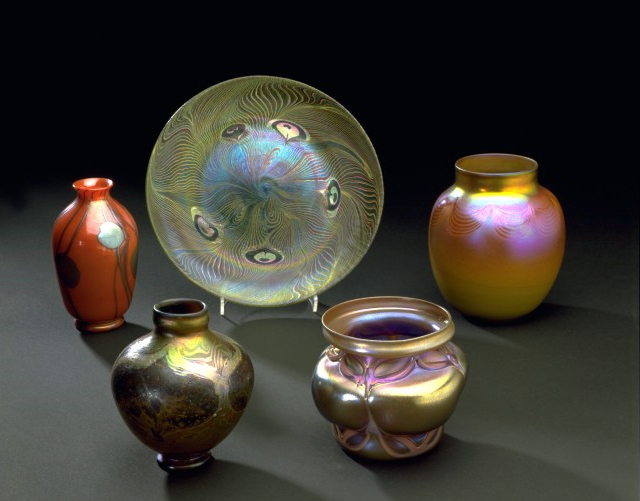
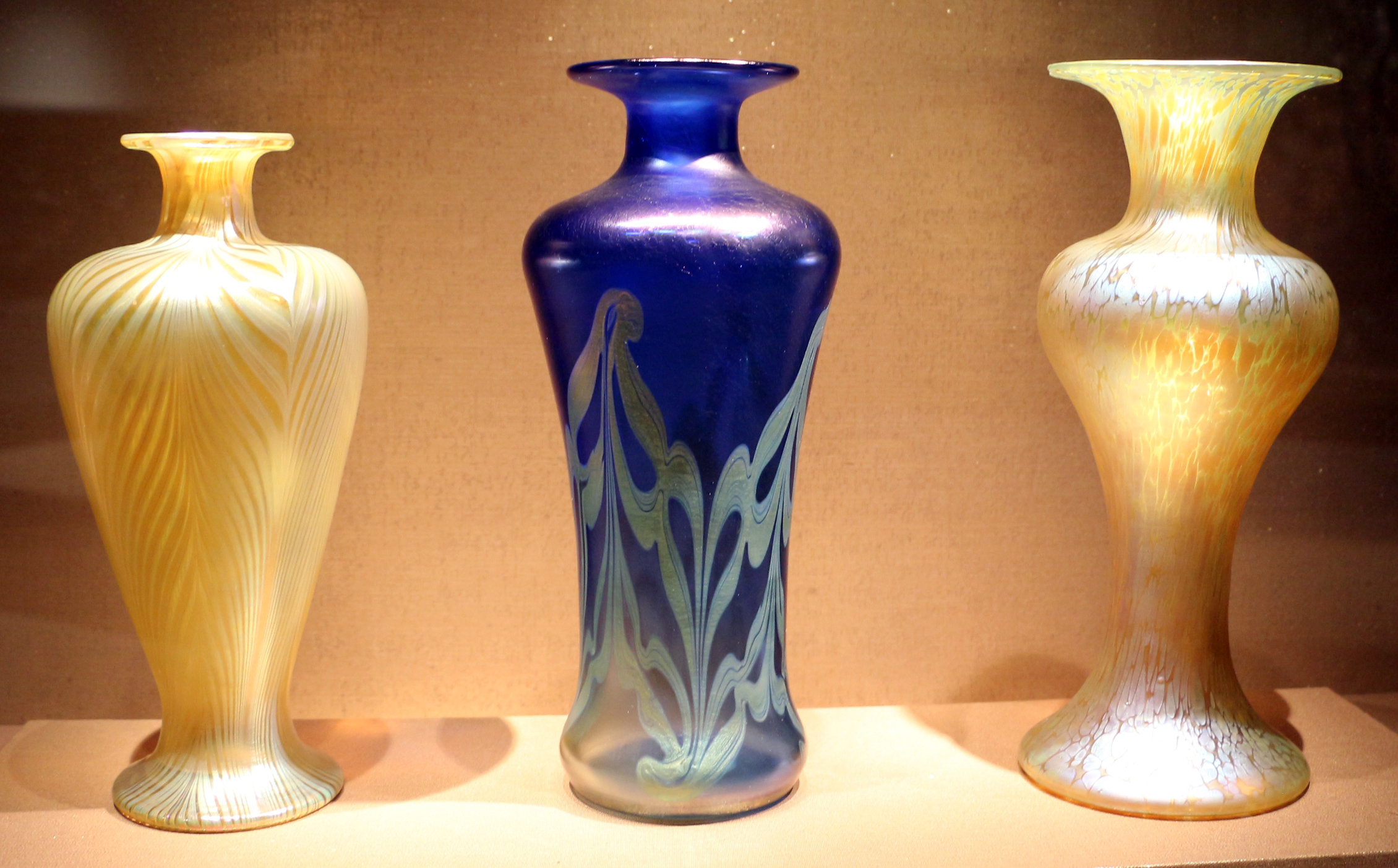
- Top: Begonia cup by Emile Gallé (1894); Center: Favrile glass by Louis Comfort Tiffany (1900–1902); Bottom: Vases by Johan Loetz Witwe (1900)
- Years active: 1890s–1914
- Location: Europe and North America

Art Nouveau glass is fine glass art in the Art Nouveau style. Typically the forms are undulating, sinuous and colorful art, usually inspired by natural forms. Pieces are generally larger than drinking glasses, and decorative rather than practical, other than for use as vases and lighting fittings; there is little tableware. Prominent makers, from the 1890s onwards, are in France René Lalique, Emile Gallé and the Daum brothers, the American Louis Comfort Tiffany, Christopher Dresser in Scotland and England, and Friedrich Zitzman, Karl Koepping and Max Ritter von Spaun in Germany. Art Nouveau glass included decorative objects, vases, lamps, and stained glass windows. It was usually made by hand, and was usually colored with metal oxides while in a molten state in a furnace.

== Techniques and innovations ==
Art Nouveau glass was in large part due to technical innovations that allowed glass to have more and better color, to be more lustrous, and to have more unusual forms. Some of these techniques had been used for centuries, but Art Nouveau glass artists greatly expanded the ways they could be used.

- Aventurine glass was first invented in 17th or 18th century Venice. It is made to imitate aventurine quartz, it is a yellow glass filled with flecks of sparkling copper particles.
- Cameo glass is like cased glass, with two layers of different colors. The outer layer is then engraved with a diamond point or etched with acid to create a two-color design.
- Cased glass is made of two layers, often of different colors, one inside the other. The outer layer (overlay) is created first, then the inner layer is blown inside the first, then the whole piece is heated so the layers fuse together.
- Crackled glass was glass filled with webs of small cracks and fissures, refracting light and causing the glass to have a sparkling effect.
- Émaux-Bijoux was a technique invented by Emile Gallé. Translucent layers of enamel were built up in layers and then fused to a foil of precious metal, which was then heated and attached to the outside of the glass object.
- Favrile glass was a type of glass invented by Louis Comfort Tiffany. Molten glass was treated with metallic oxides that were absorbed into the glass and created a distinctive iridescent surface effect.
- Flashed glass fused a thin outer layer of glass to a thicker glass object, often of a different color. The larger object was dipped into molten glass, then heated to fuse the outer layer to the object. The outer layer could then be etched, often diamond, to reveal the color beneath.
- Glass marquetry was a technique developed by Émile Gallé in Nancy. It was similar to marquetry in wood, a method of adding colors that are integral to the body of the piece. It involves adding thin layers of colored glass to the exterior of a glass object, often with a thin layer of clear crystal as the outer layer. He then fired the piece in the oven, then the outside surface was etched by acid or engraved with a diamond to expose the design in the layers beneath.
- Pâte de verre or glass casting is a form of kiln casting which was frequently used by Émile Gallé and Daum Glass. In this process, finely crushed glass is mixed with a binding material, such as a mixture of gum arabic and water, and often with colorants and enamels. The resultant paste is applied to the inner surface of a negative mould forming a coating. After the coated mould is fired at the appropriate temperature the glass is fused creating a hollow object that can have thick or thin walls depending on the thickness of the pate de verre layers.
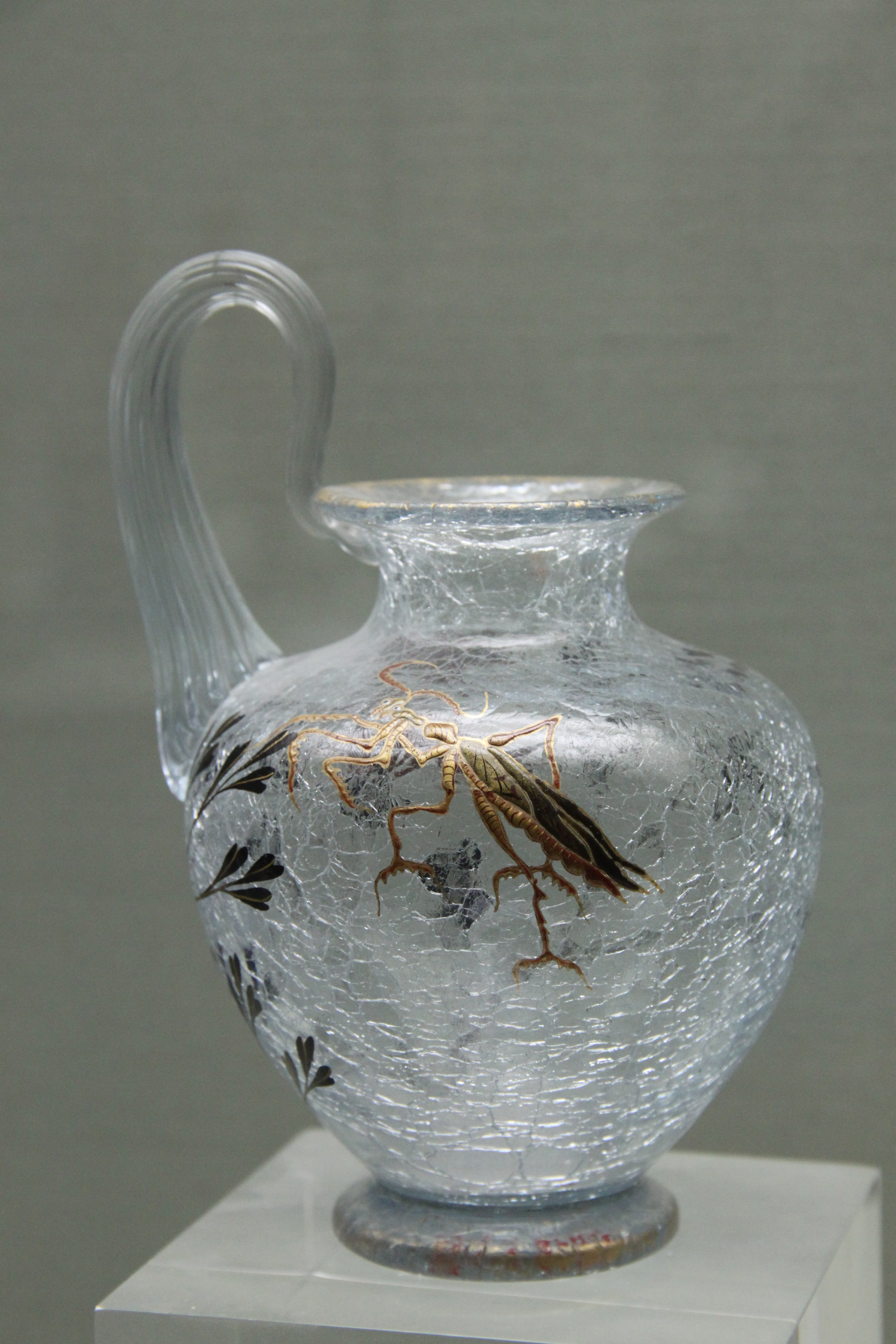
Crackled glass vase with enamel mantis and cicadas applied to the surface, by Emile Gallé (1889)

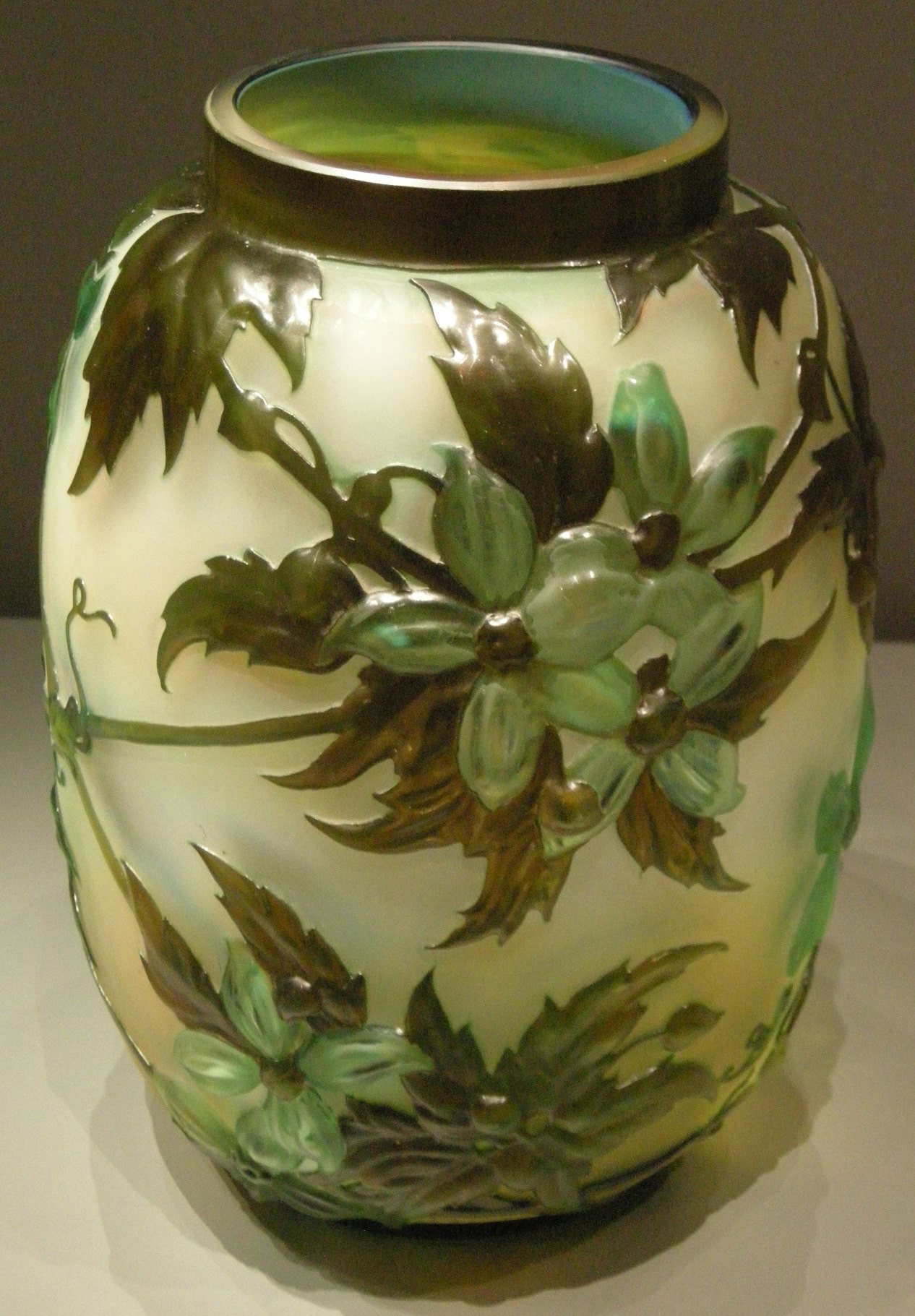
Glass marquetry with clematis flowers by Gallé (1890–1900)

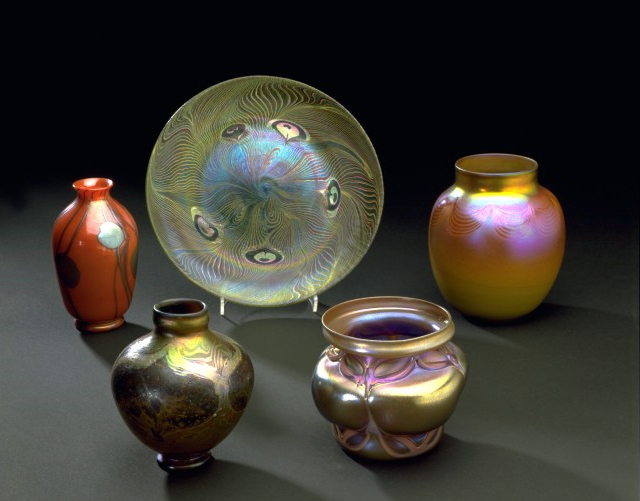
Examples of iridescent Favrile glass by Louis Comfort Tiffany (1896–1902) (Victoria and Albert Museum, London)

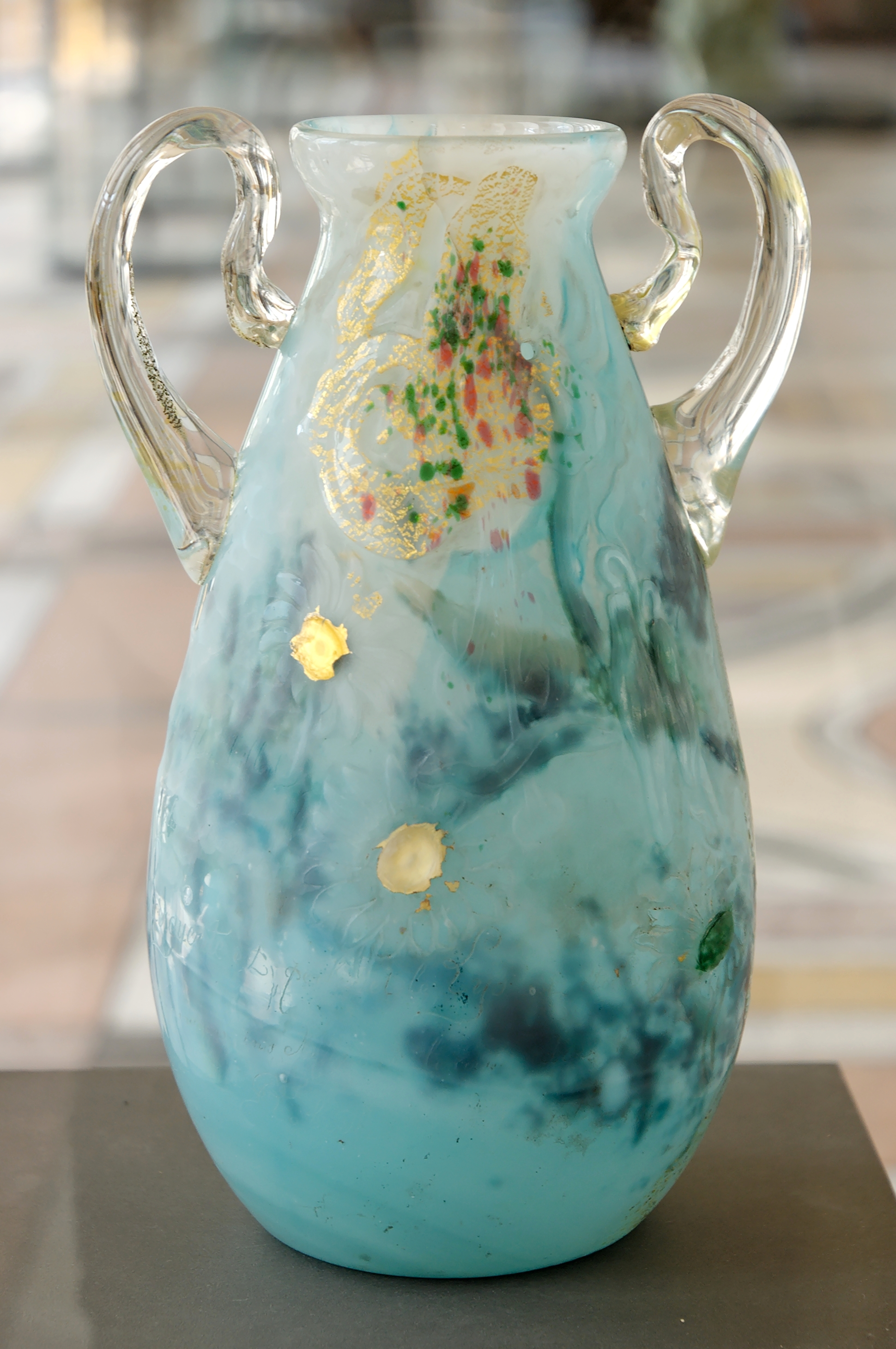
Vase with lilies and daises by Gallé (1896)

== France ==
=== Émile Gallé and the Daum brothers ===
The city of Nancy in France was an important center for Art Nouveau glass manufacture. The dominant figure in the early style was Émile Gallé of that city. He learned glassmaking in the factory of his father in Nancy, which also made furniture and ceramics. He studied philosophy, botany and zoology, and also studied painting. He made study trips to London and Paris, where he discovered Japanese art and decoration, which he applied to his glass. He inherited the family firm in 1884, and produced a remarkable series of glass objects, using techniques of engraving glass borrowed from Chinese art glass, and methods of layering plaques of glass. He also developed methods to improve the color and luminosity of glass, without losing clarity. He presented his Art Nouveau works with success at the Paris Universal Exposition of 1900, and was a founder of the Ecole de Nancy, bridging together architect, glass and furniture designers.

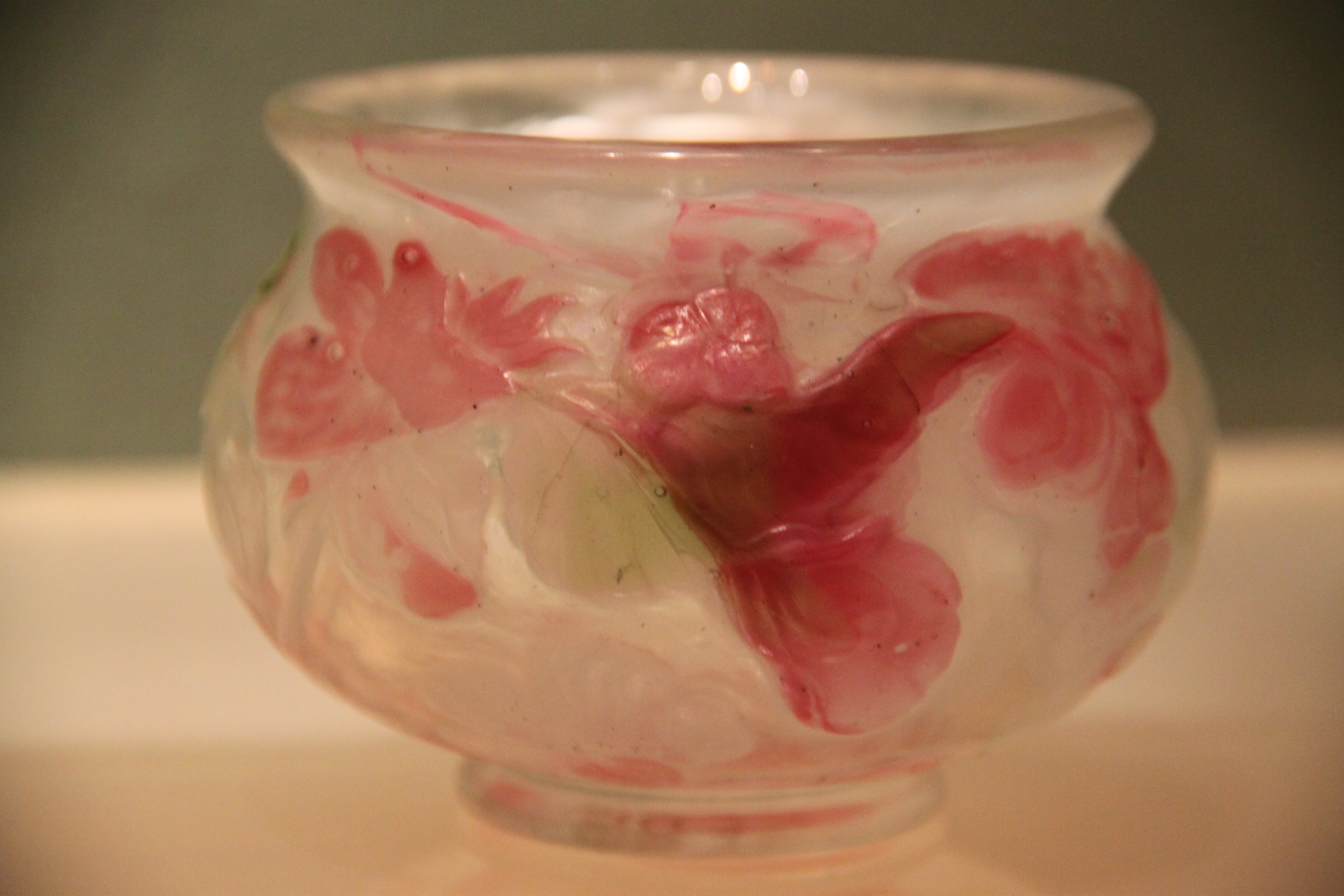
Begonia Rose cup by Émile Gallé (1894). Glass marquetry and engraving, overlays applied to surface.

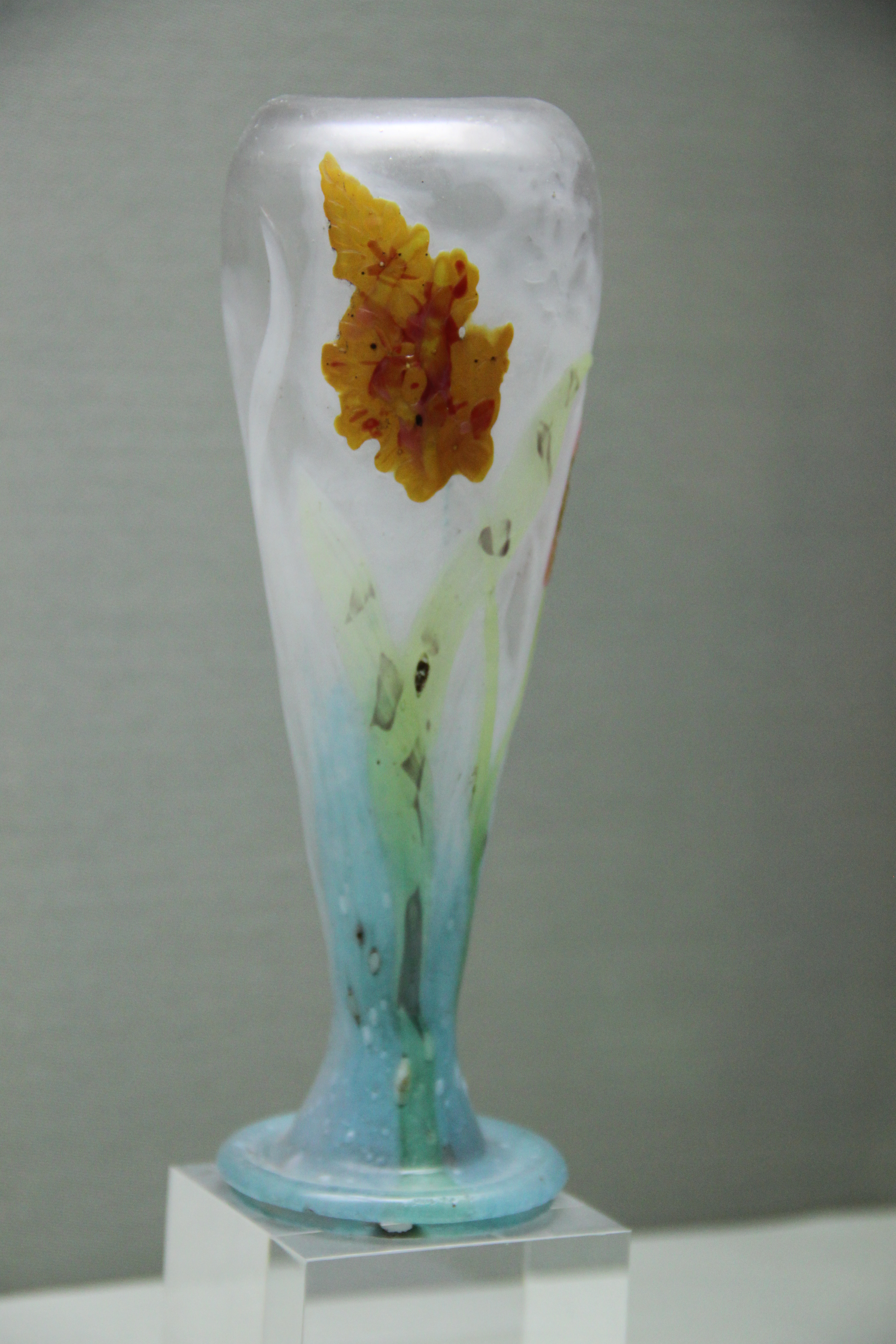
Orchid vase by Gallé (1897)

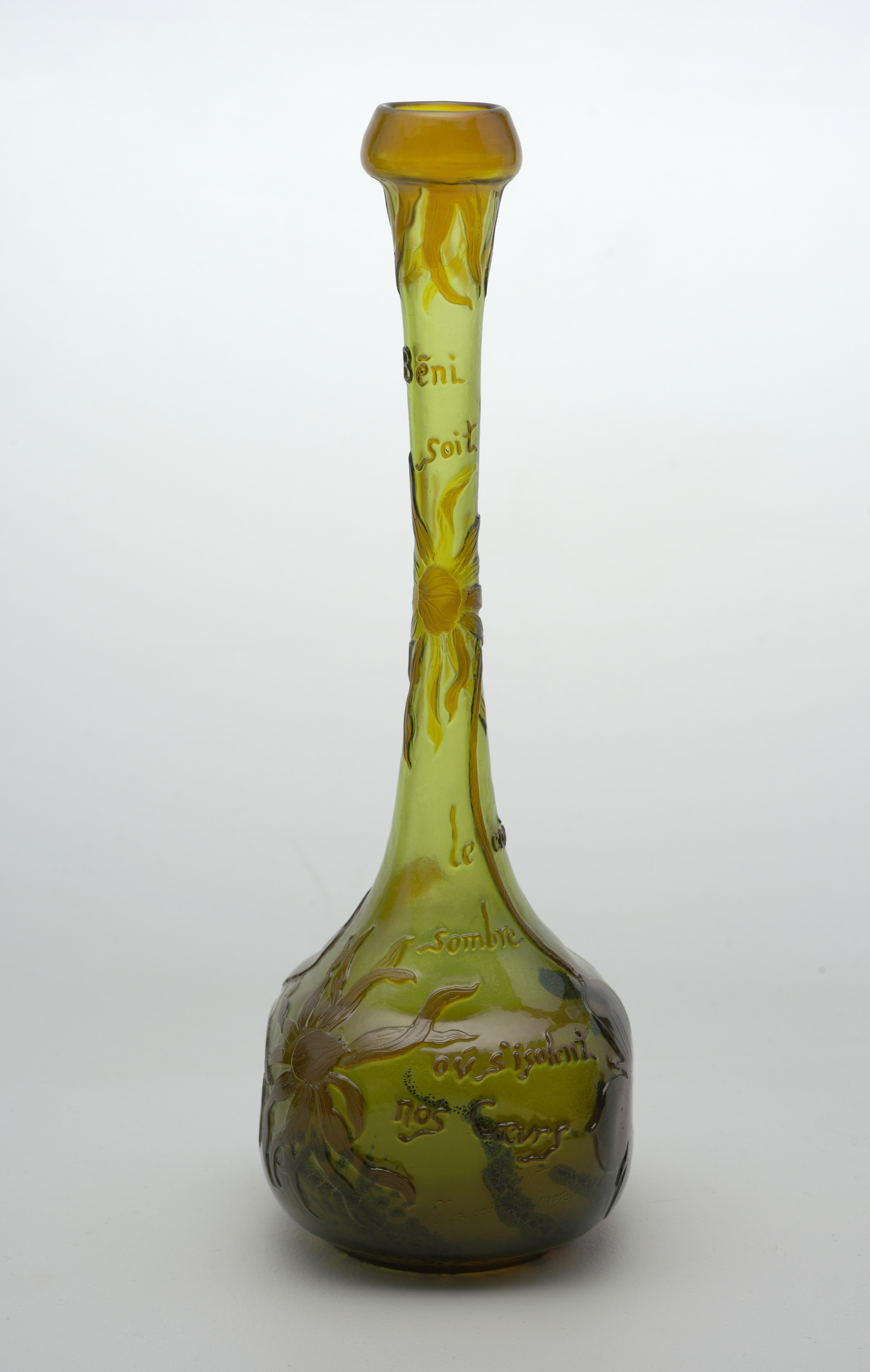
Bud vase by Gallé (1900)

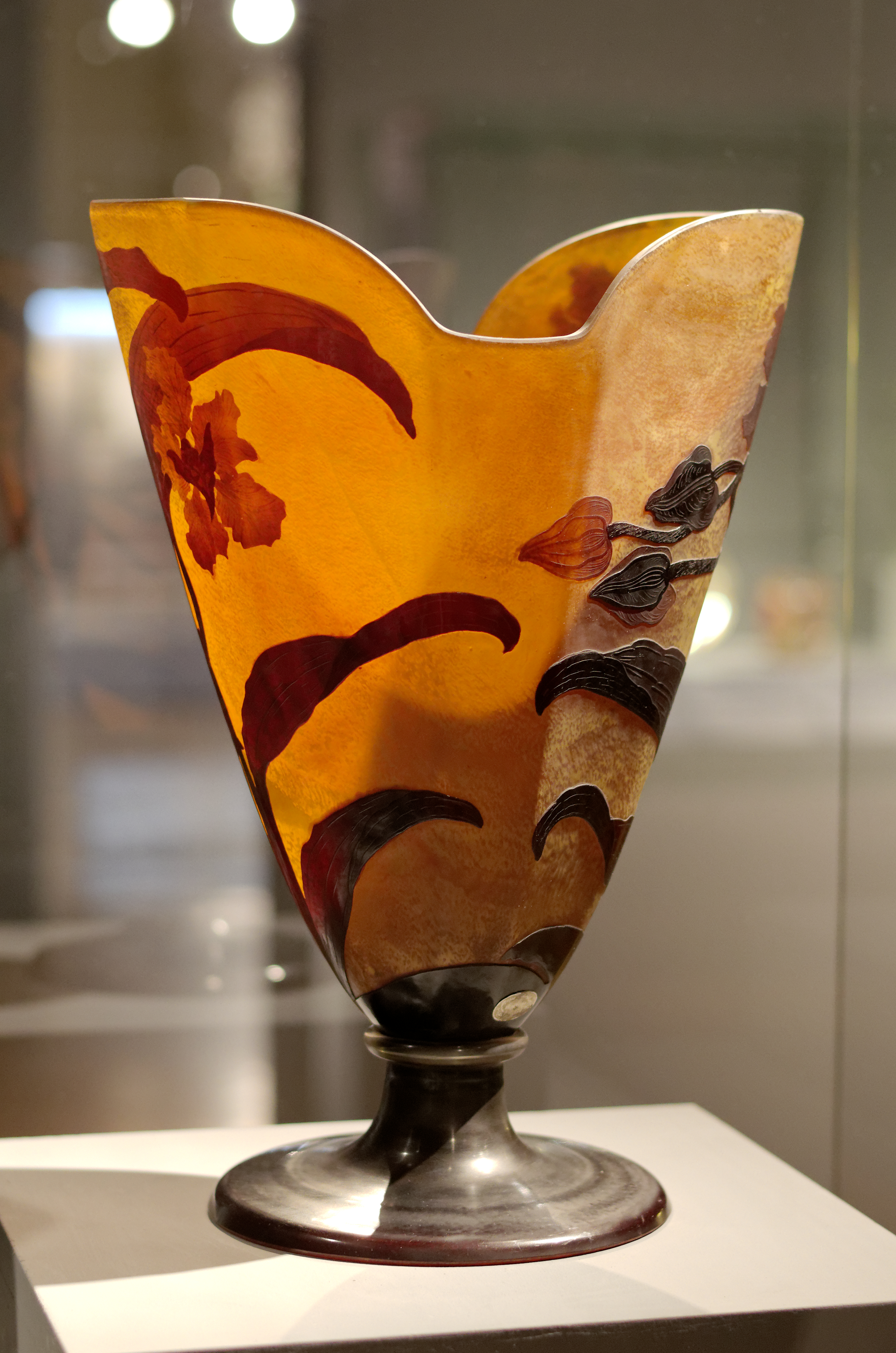
Orchid branch vase by Gallé (1900)

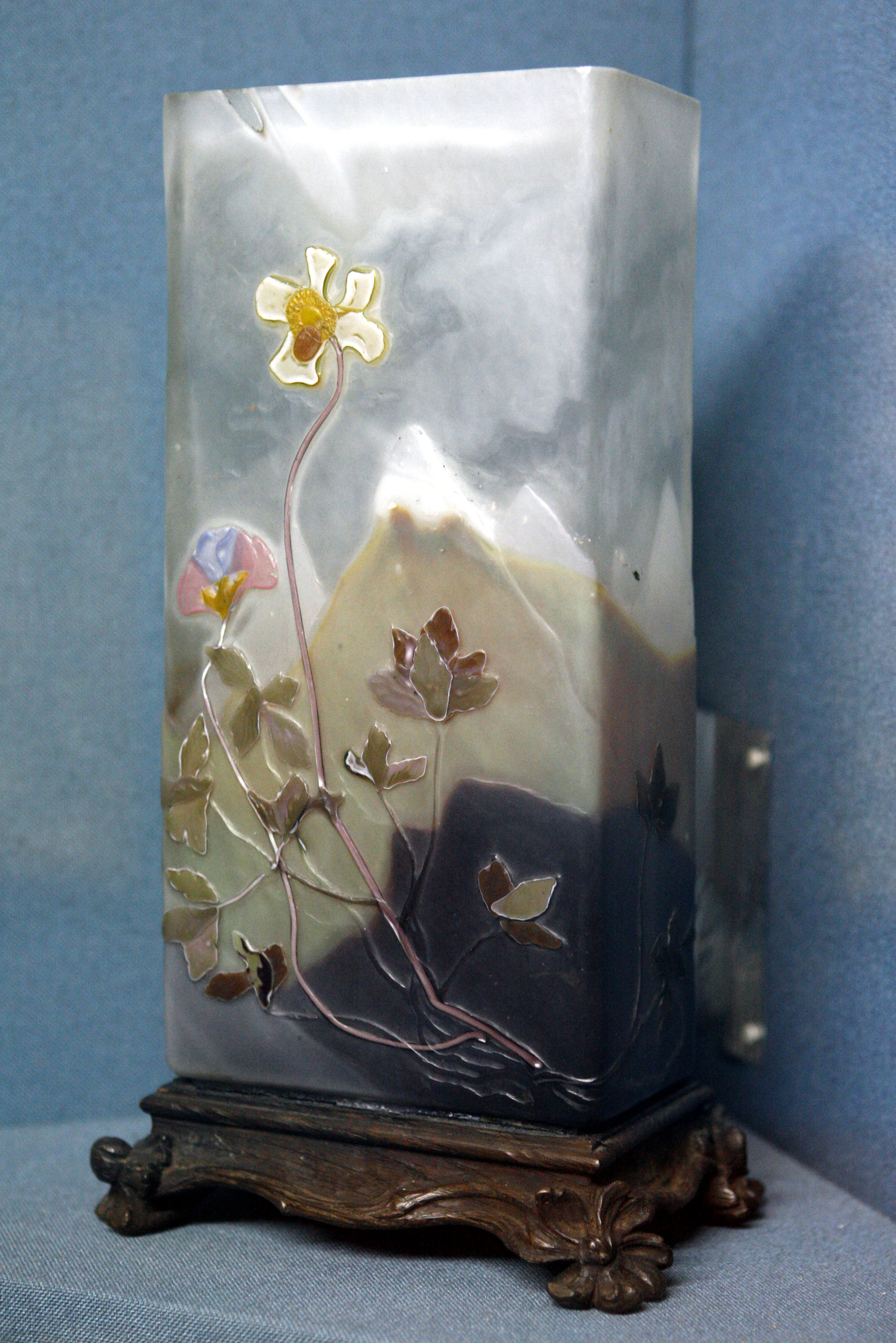
Engraved crystal vase by Gallé (c. 1900)

Glassware and crystal were arts for which Nancy became particularly known. The glassmaker Jean Daum emigrated to France in 1878 and started his own studio, Daum Glass, which was inherited by his two sons, Antonin Daum and his brother Auguste Daum. They guided the company into the Art Nouveau. The Daum brothers expressed their goal at the end of the 1880s: "to apply in an industrial way the true principles of decorative art."

Their method was to produce objects in series, as well as one-of-a-kind items, and they adapted well to the new technology of electric light bulbs. The vases and lamps usually had very simple designs taken from plants or vegetables, with monochrome or richly varied colors of many different layers of glass within the lamp.

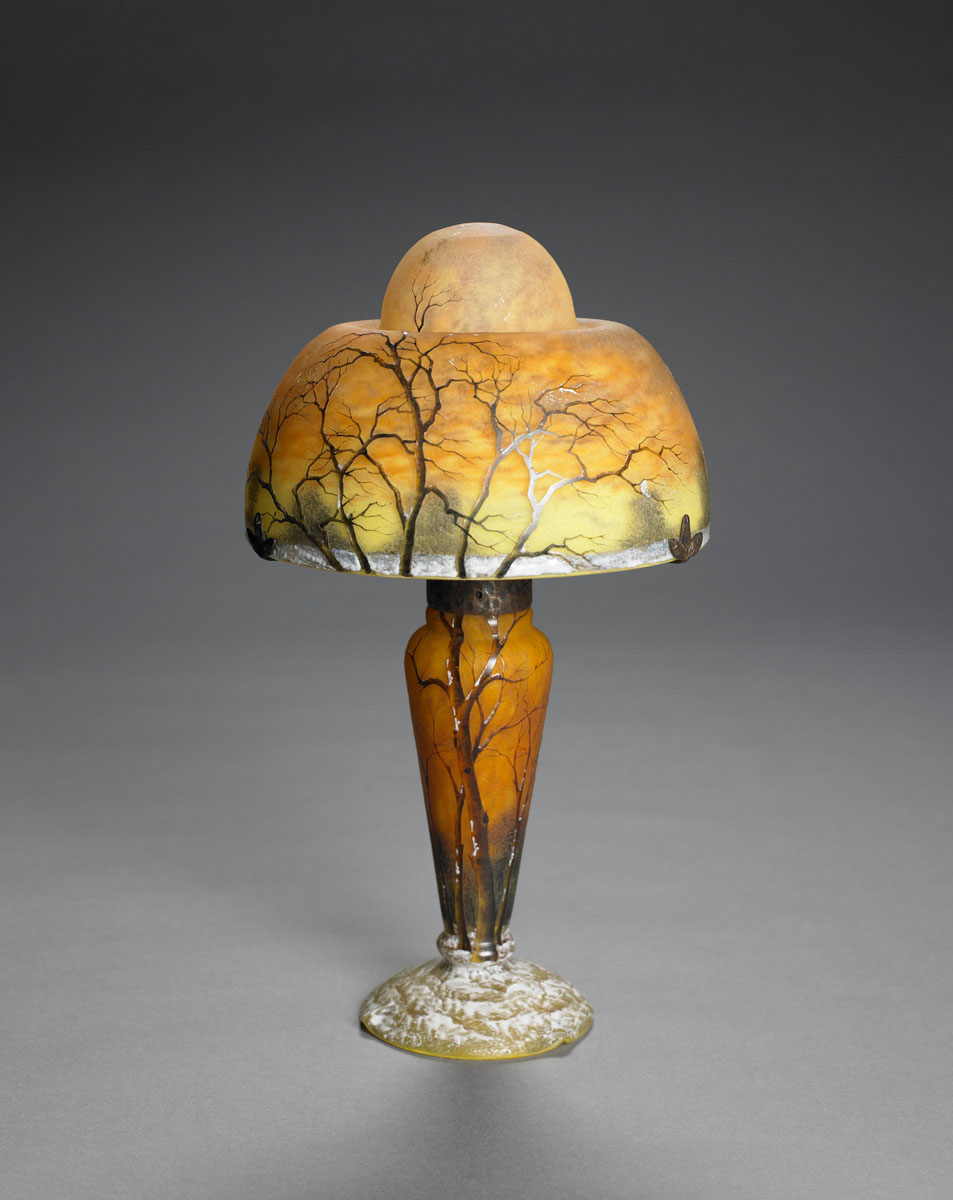
Daum lamp with trees and fallen snow (c. 1900)

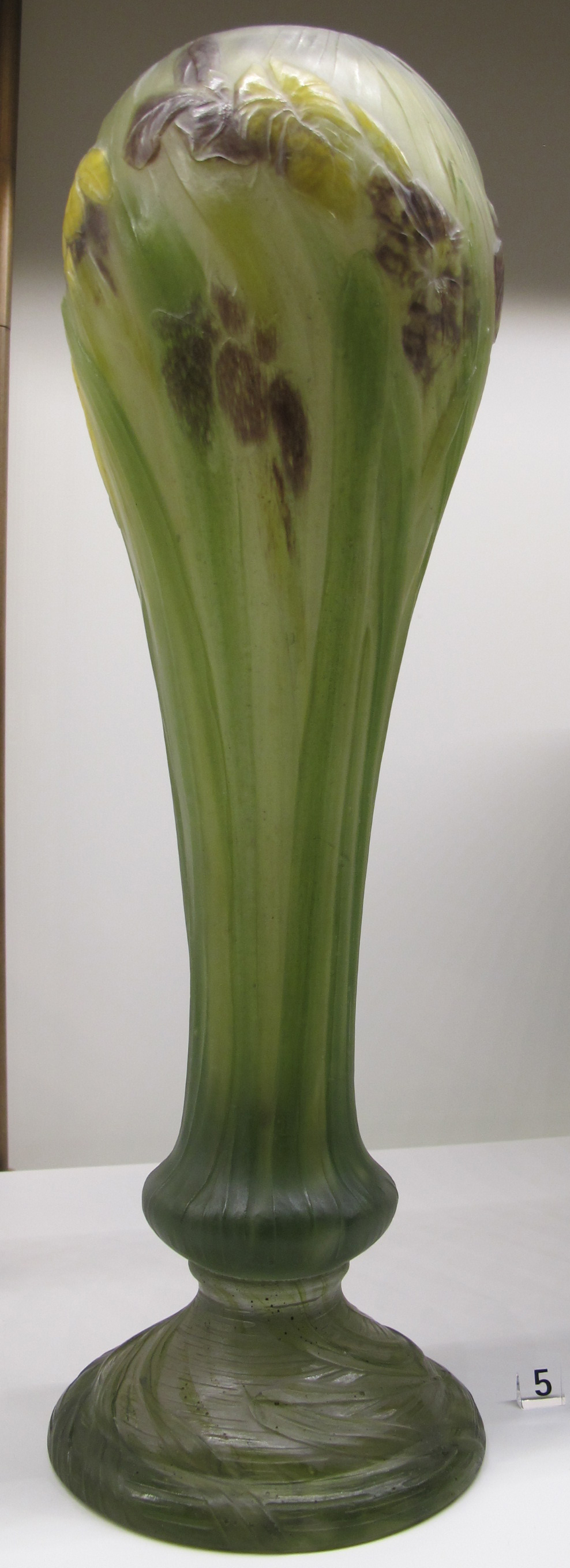
Daum crystal vase with iris flowers (c. 1900)

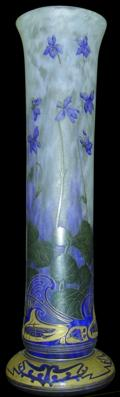
Daum vase with cricket design (1900)

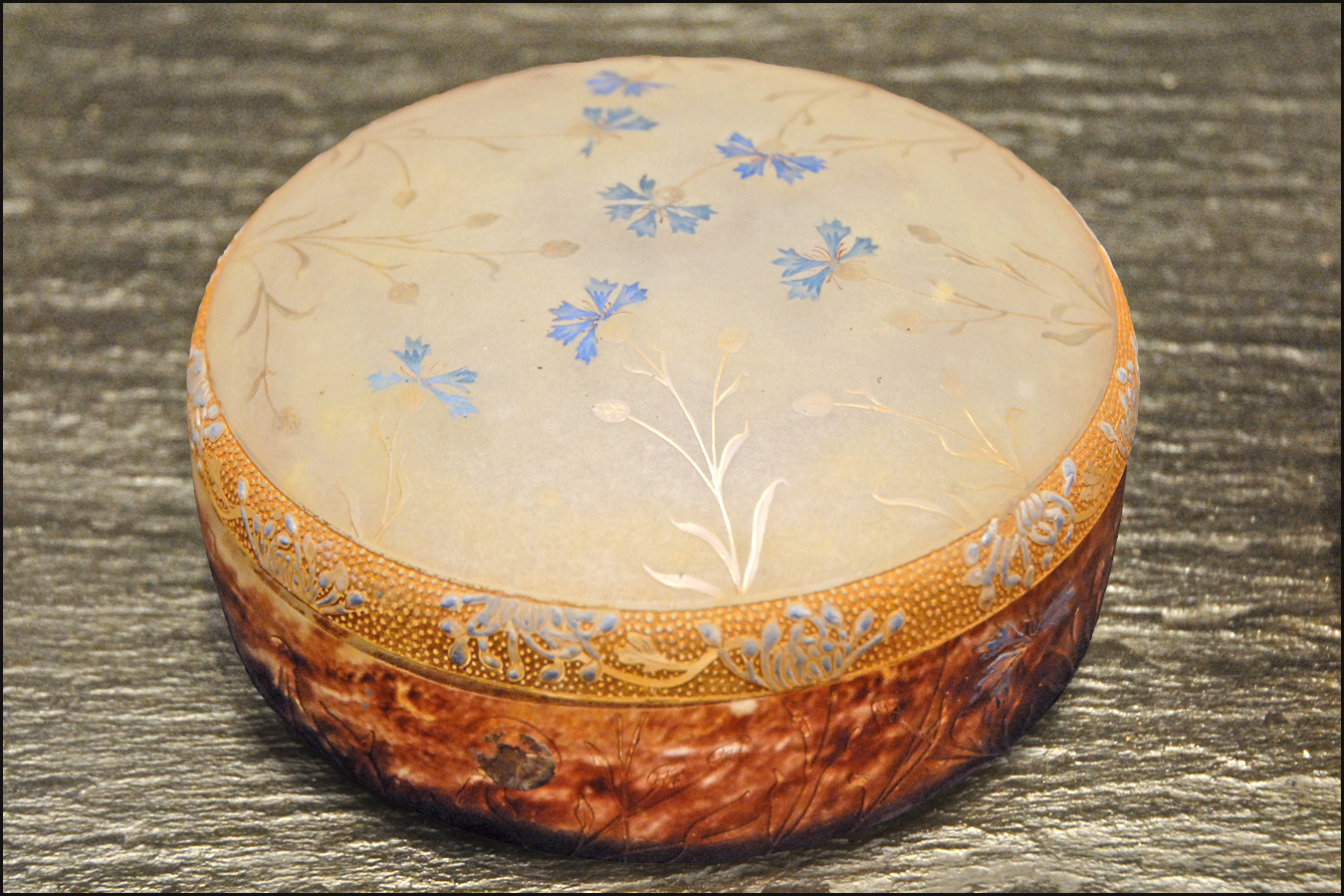
Daum candy container with cornflower design of engraved glass, enamel, and gold (1901)

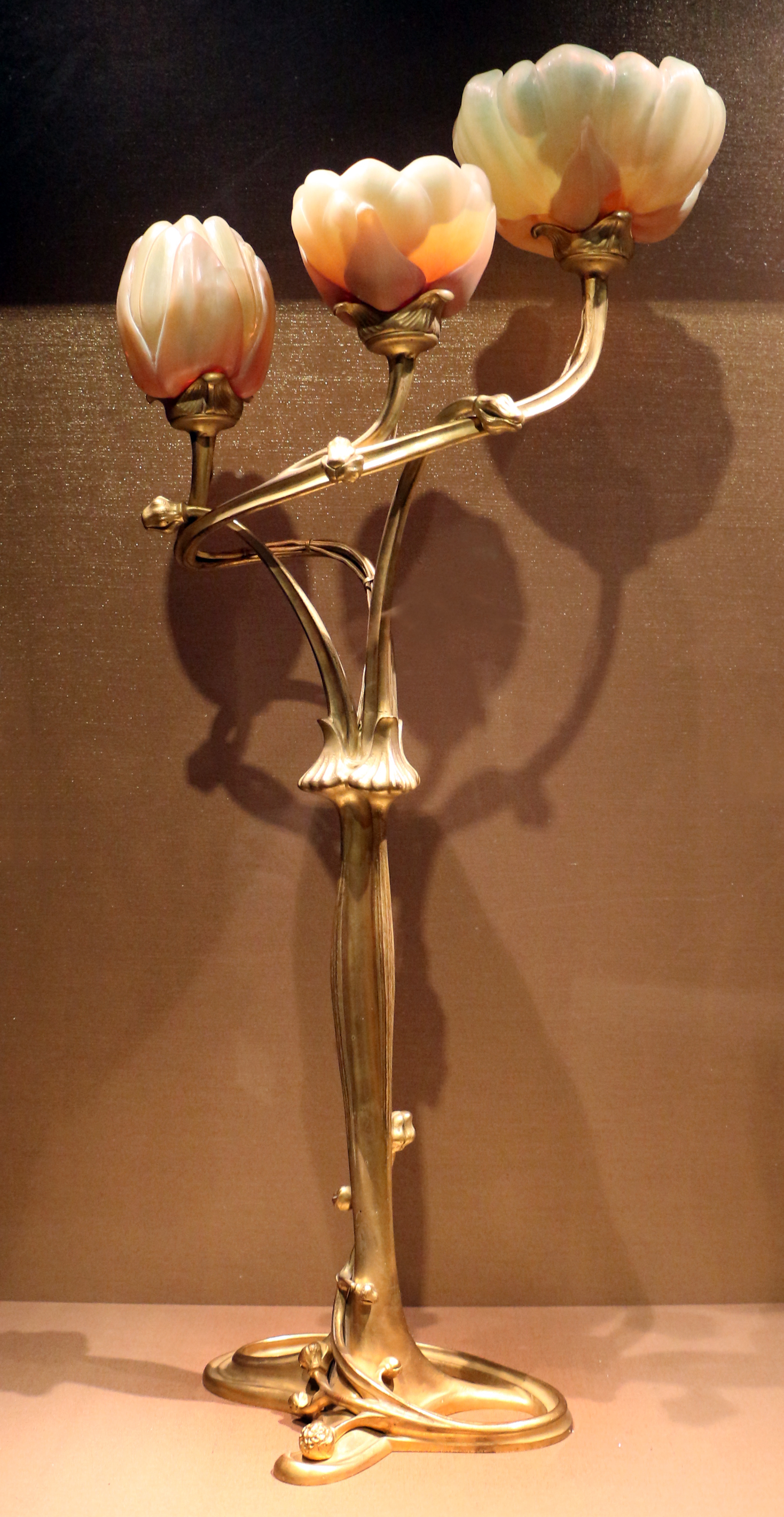
Daum lamp with magnolia flowers, designed with Louis Majorelle (1903)

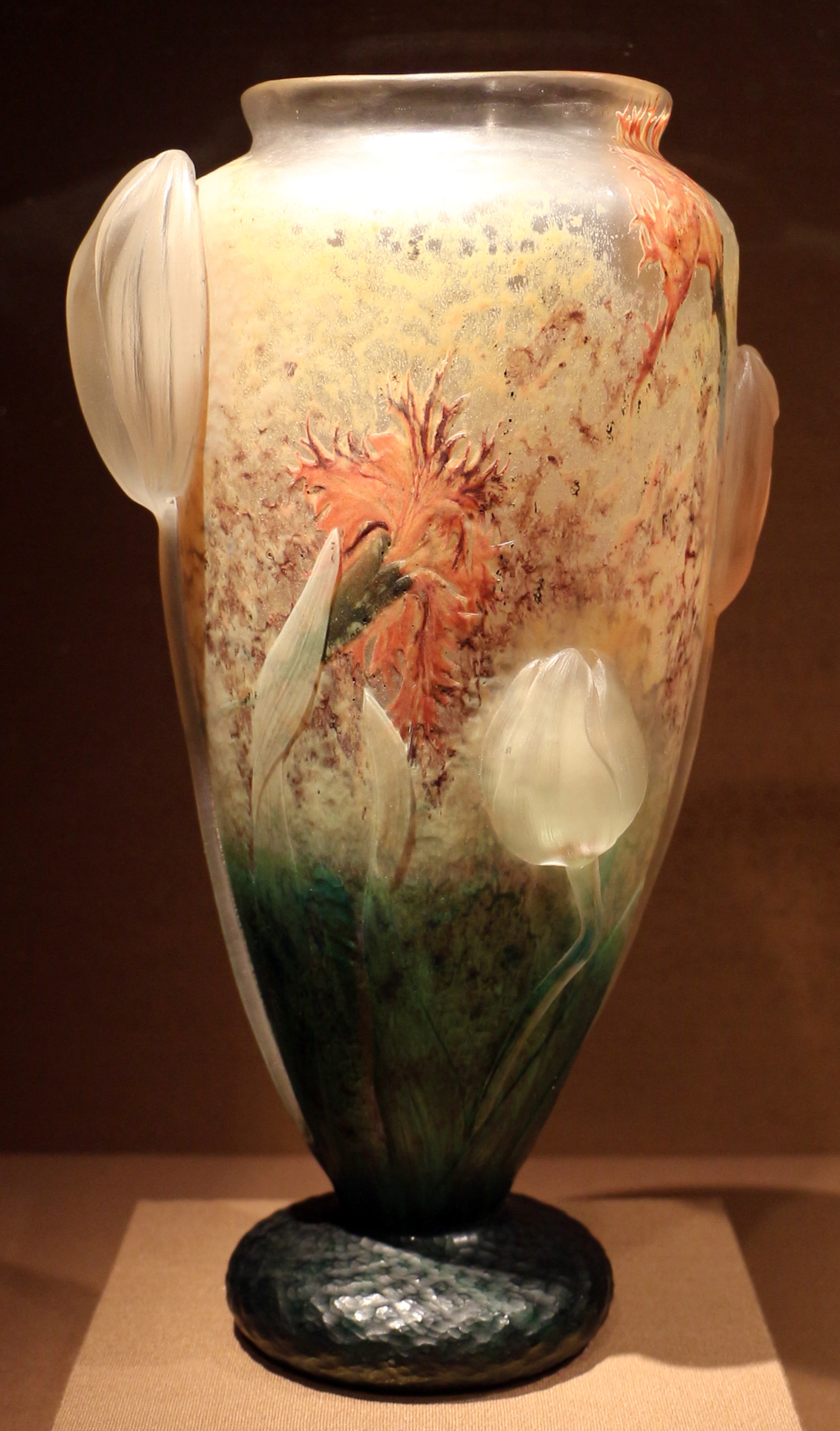
Tulip vase by Antonin Daum (1910)

=== René Lalique ===
René Lalique was another prominent designer of Art Nouveau glass. Beginning in 1895 he made pieces for the shop of Samuel Bing, the Maison de l'Art Nouveau, which gave Art Nouveau its name. He met the perfume creator François Coty and in 1908 he pioneered in the design of perfume bottles, small glass symbols of modernity, which became a new genre of glass art. One example was the sepia stained glass bottle for 'Ambre Antique' Perfume. Another original design by Lalique was a sugar bowl made of sepia stained glass, wrapped in serpents made of silver (see image below).

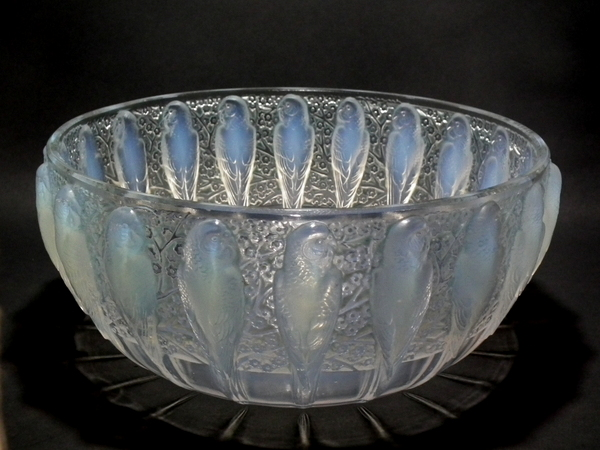
Perruches ("Parakeet") bowl of opalescent glass, by René Lalique

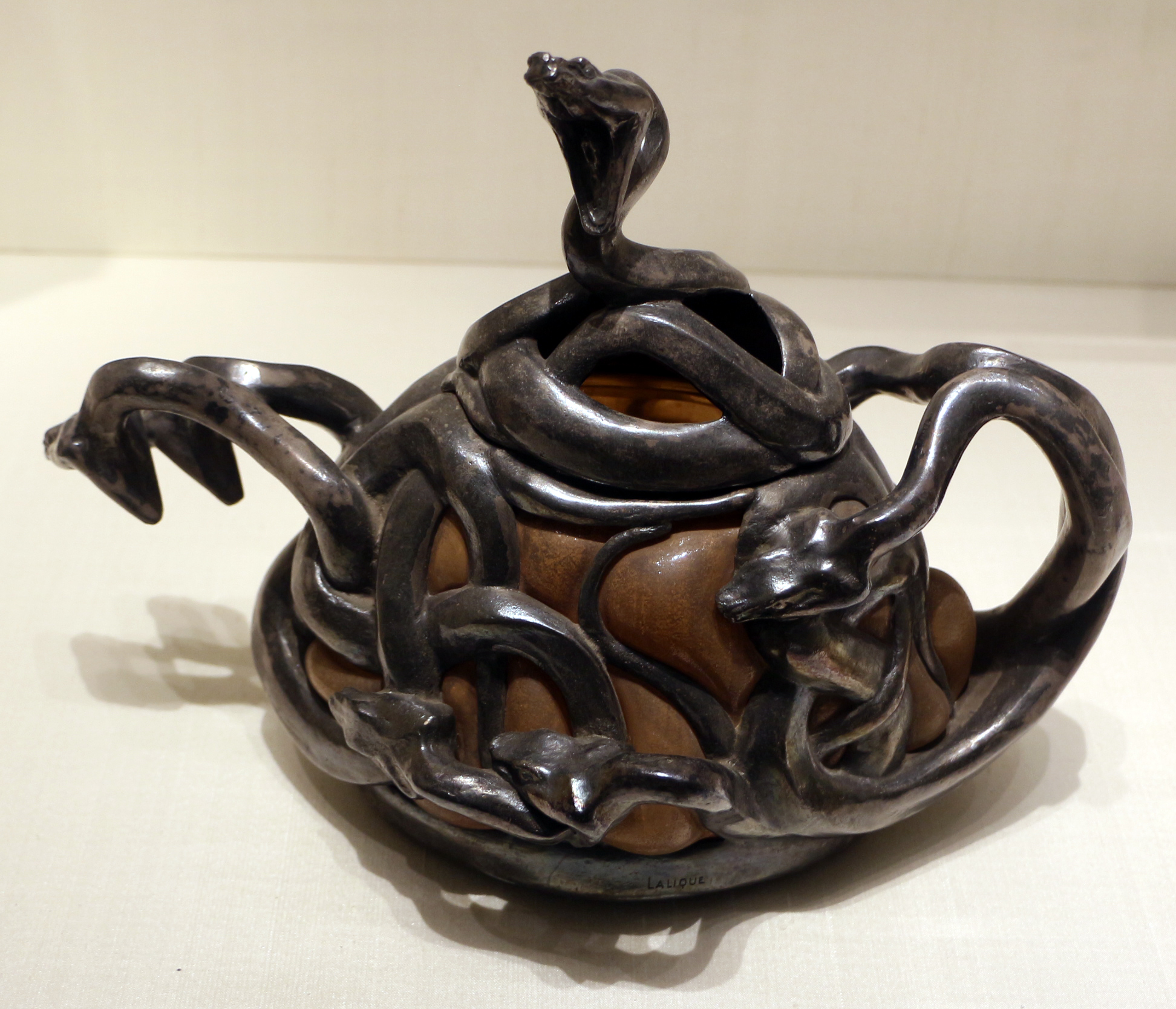
Sepia-colored glass sugar bowl with snakes of silver by Lalique (1902) (Calouste Gulbenkian Museum, Lisbon)

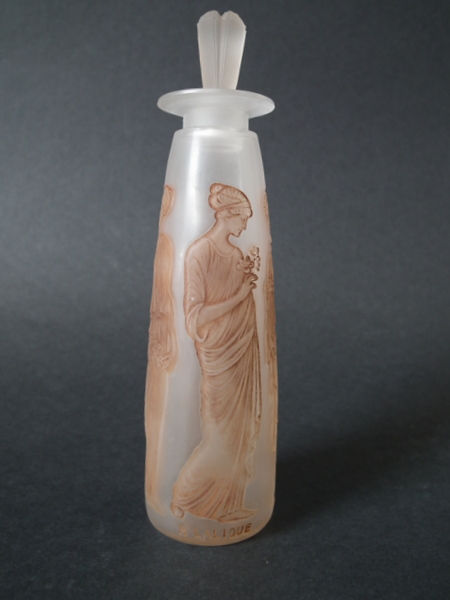
Bottle made by Lalique for Ambre Antique perfume by François Coty (1908)

=== Other French artists ===
Henri Cros was another notable figure in French glass, who rediscovered the ancient Roman technique of pate-de-verre, or glass casting that was described by Pliny. It was made by mixing, when cold, crushed glass, powdered enamels, and binder, usually water. The paste is applied to inner surface of a mold, then fired. When the firing is done, the mould is removed. If the glass piece does not crumble, it is a fully-colored free-standing piece of sculpture. The glass paste was used by other French glassmakers, including Albert Dammouse, Georges Despret and Francois Deorchement.

Other notable figures in French glass art included Muller Frères, a group of brothers originally from Alsace, whose members had fled from Alsace to Nancy after the German occupation in 1871. The brothers were skilled craftsmen, who found employment at first with Emile Gallé, then set up their own factory nearby in Lunéville. They became expert in glass engraving techniques, especially acid etching and also in layering glass, adding as many as seven colors. They also followed the lead of Gallé in their choice of subjects, focusing on flora and animals. They opened up a collaboration with the Belgian glass factory of Val Saint Lambert, and developed with them a new technique of enamelling and engraving called fluogravure, simpler and with fewer risks of breaking than the method used by Gallé and the Daum brothers. It involved touching the different layers of glass with enamels of various tones, then using acid to fix the colors.

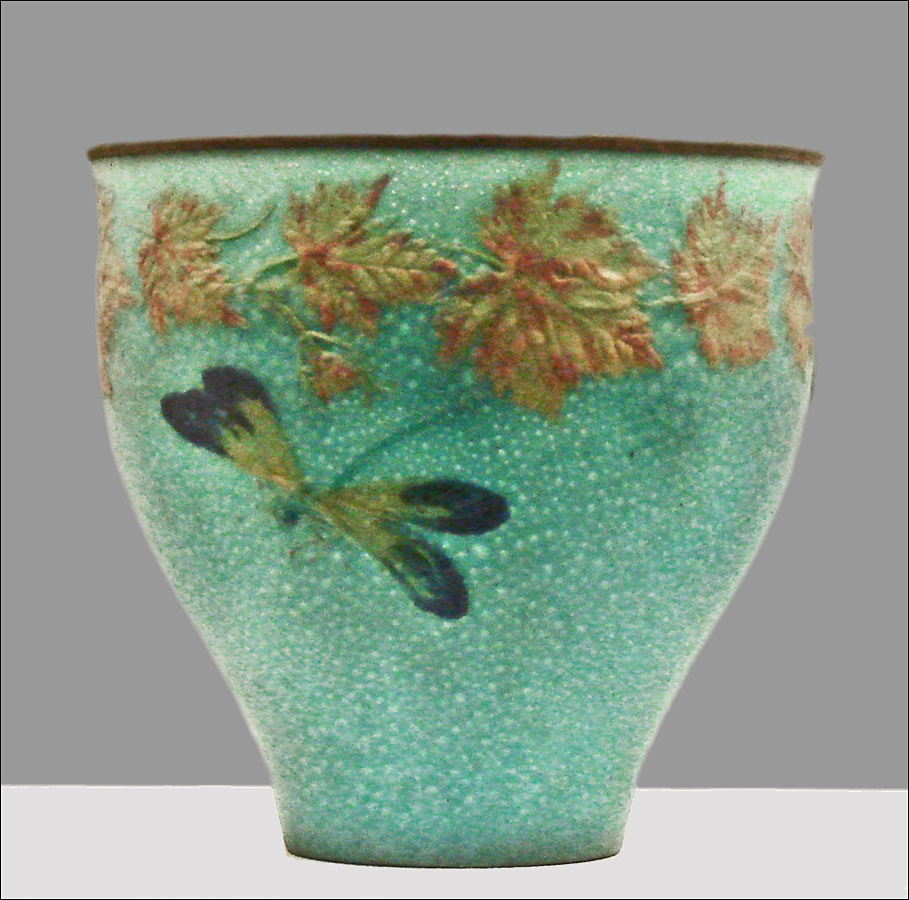
Glass casting work by Albert-Louis Dammouse

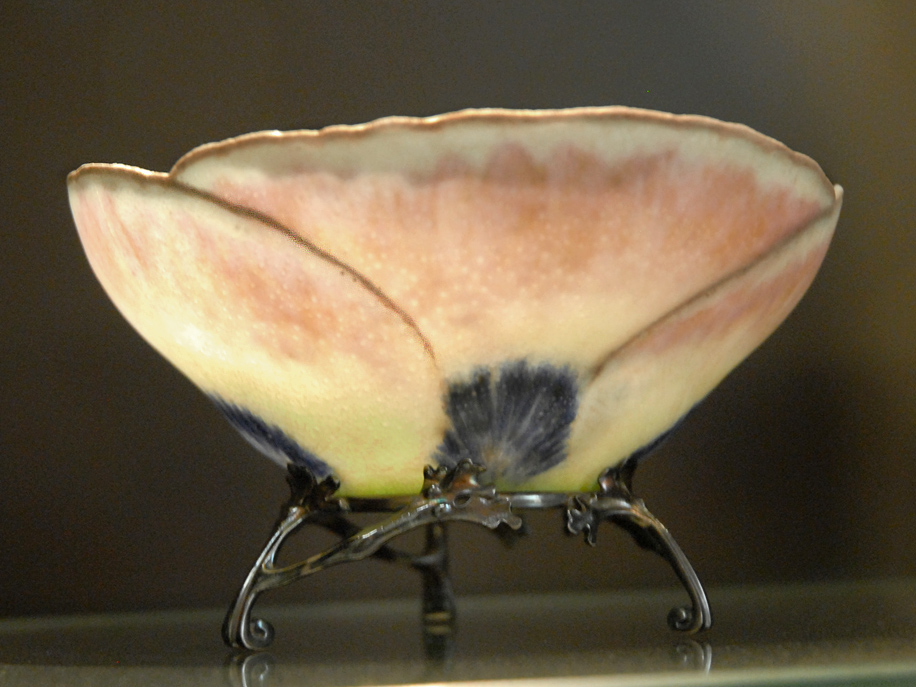
Cup of glass casting by Dammouse (Musée d'Orsay, Paris)

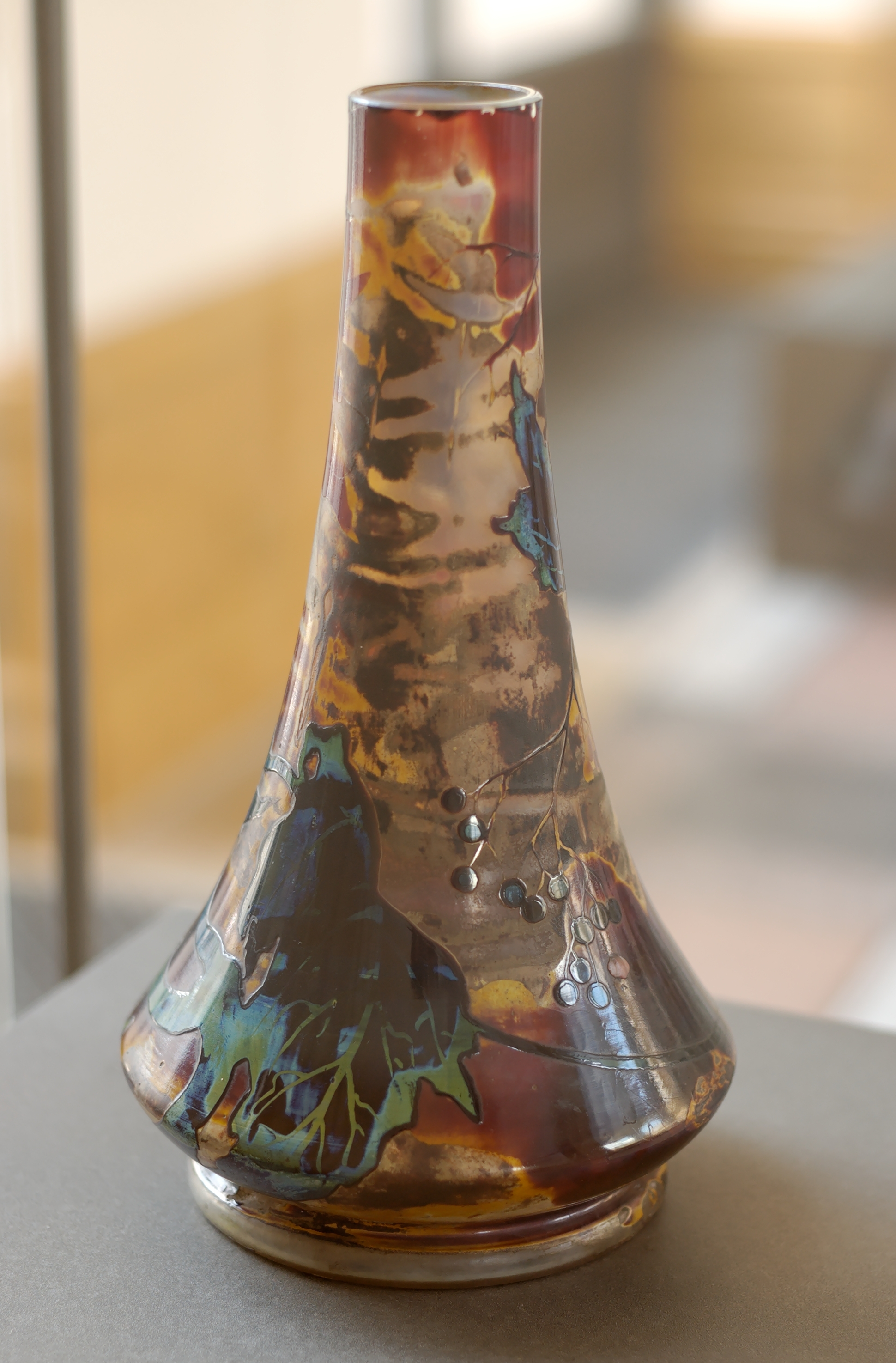
Glass-casting work by Francois-Emile Décorchemont (1910). Dark green and blue grass with brown glass paste attachments. (Petit Palais)

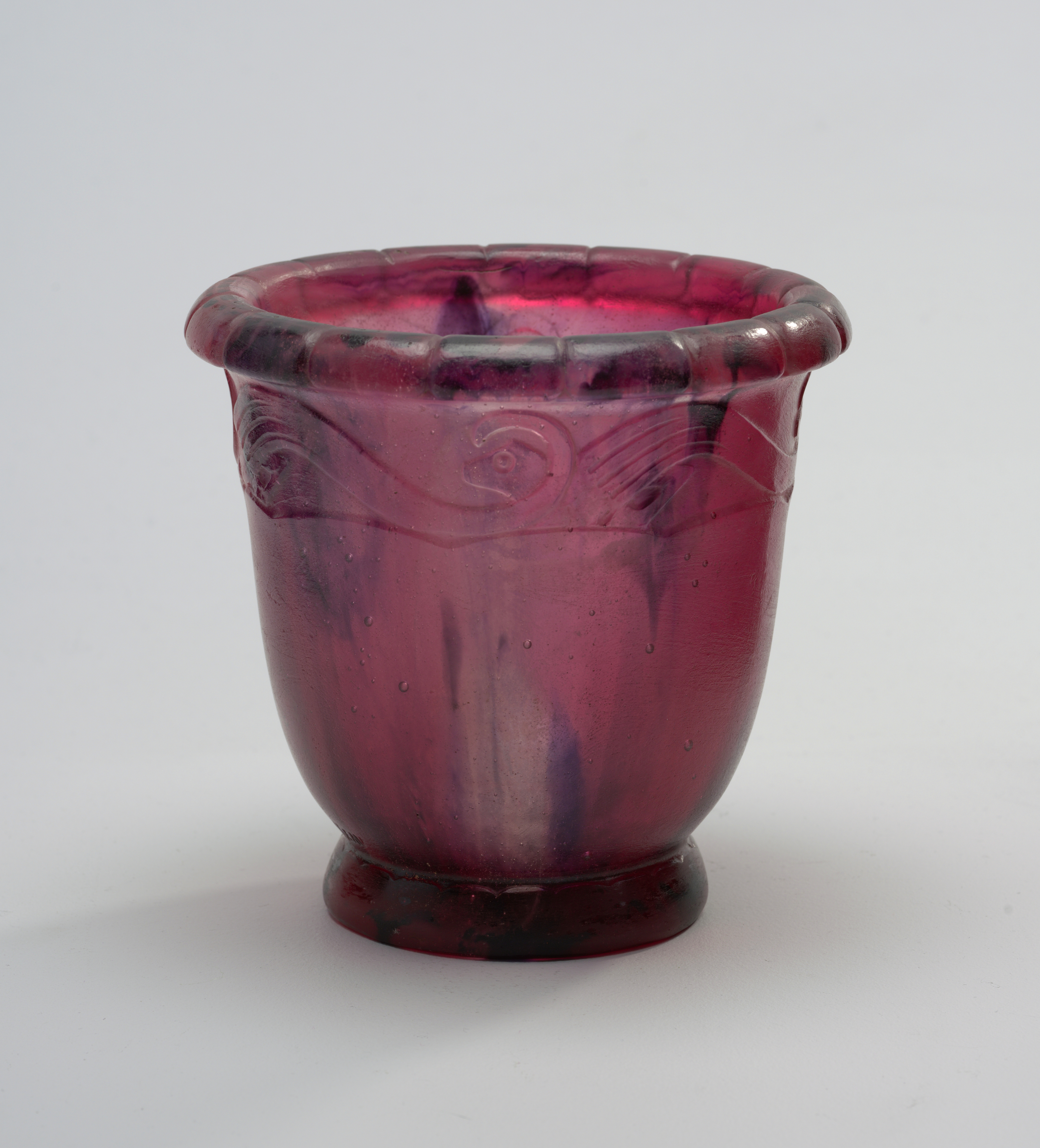
Les Baies ("Berries") vase by Muller Frères (c. 1900). Double glass, devitrified on surface, etched with hydrofluoric acid and decorated with colored enamels. (Petit Palais, Paris)

== United States ==
=== Louis Comfort Tiffany ===
Louis Comfort Tiffany was the leading figure in American Art Nouveau glass design. His father was a famous New York jeweler, and he studied painting in New York and Paris before opening a firm of interior decoration in New York in 1897. He founded the Tiffany Glass Company in 1885, which became the Tiffany Studio after 1900, and opened his own glass factory on Long Island in 1892. In the early 1890s, working with Arthur Nash, an English glassmaker from Stourbridge England, he invented a method for blending different colors of glass in a molten state in a furnace. They also treated glass with various metallic oxides and exposed it to acid fumes to achieve more brilliant lustre and light effects. Tiffany named this kind of Favrile glass, from the Old English word 'fabrile' or handmade. Tiffany marketed his early Art Nouveau works at the gallery of Samuel Bing in Paris, which gave Art Nouveau its name. He was particularly known for his floral lamps, which became emblems of the Art Nouveau style. Some of the most famous Tiffany lamps were designed by one his artists, Clara Driscoll.

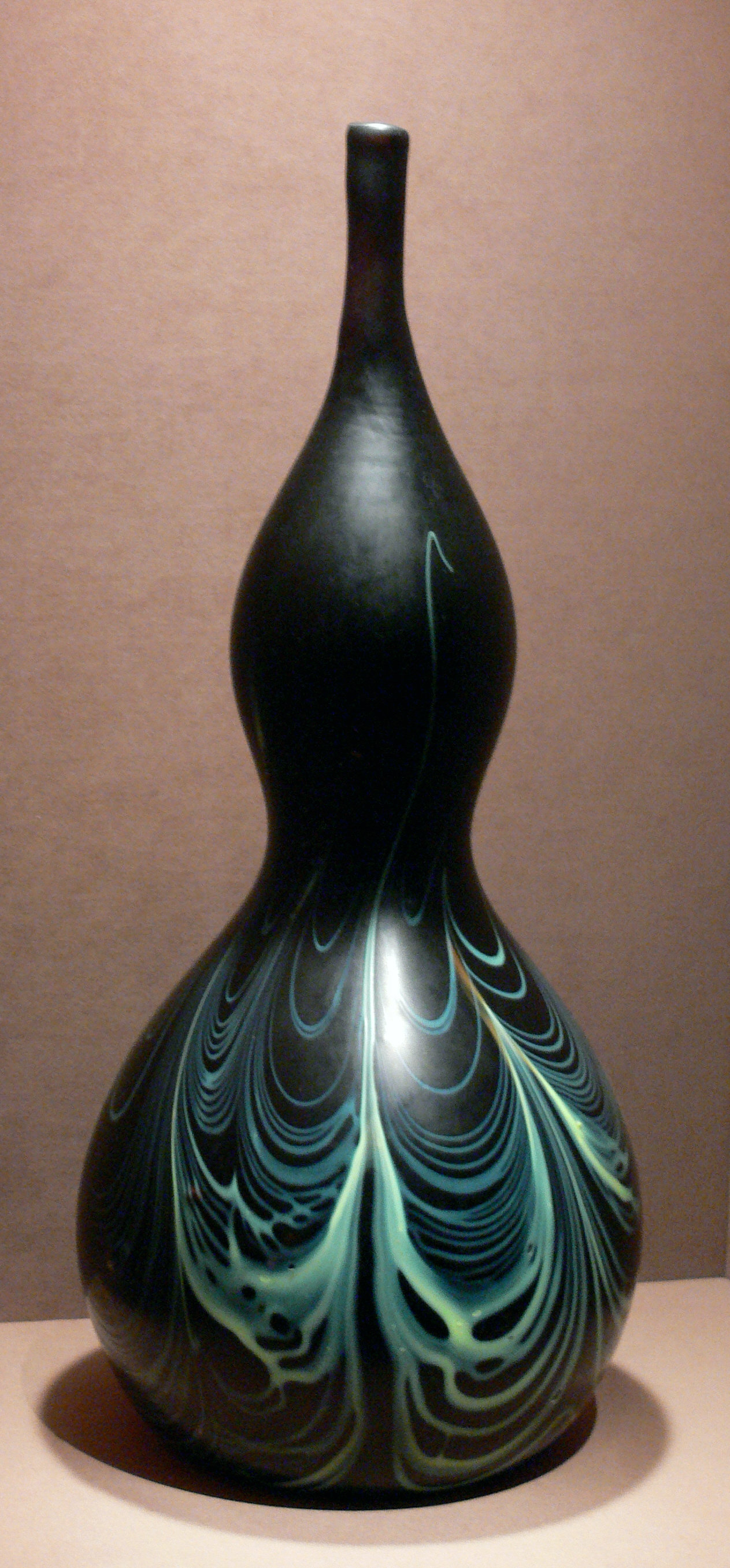
Favrile glass vase by Louis Comfort Tiffany (1893–1897)

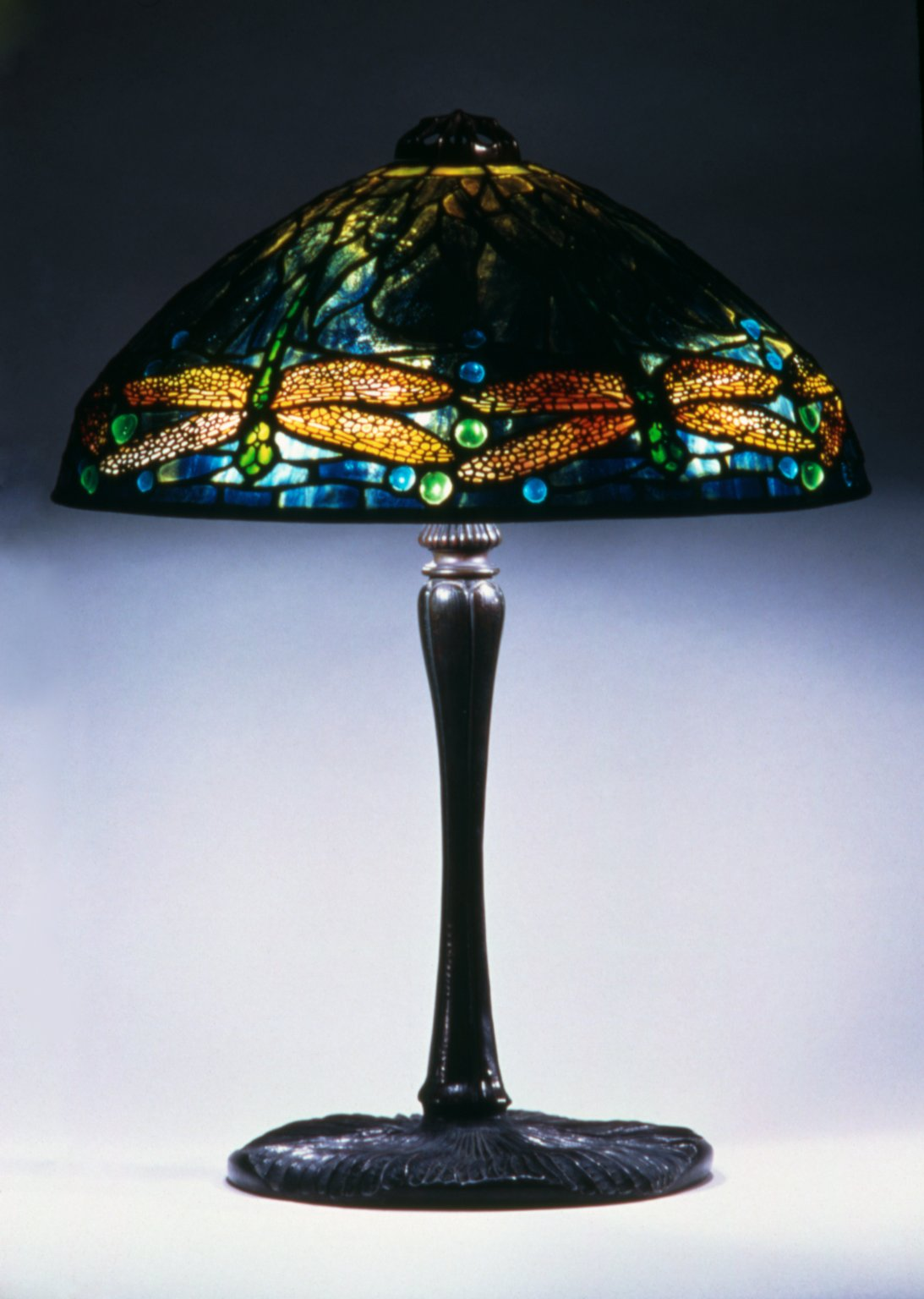
Dragonfly lamp by Clara Driscoll for Tiffany (1900)

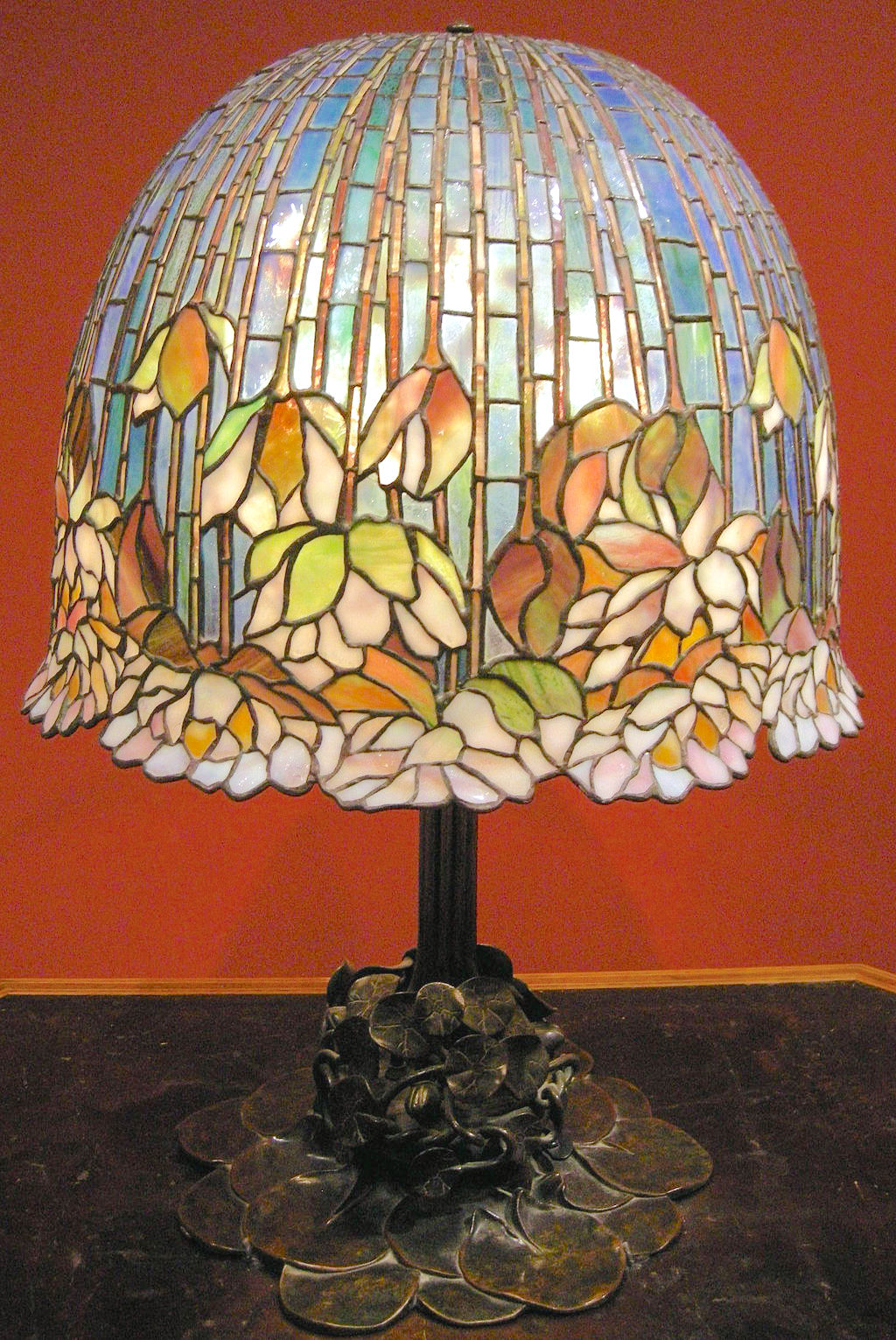
Lily lamp by Tiffany (1900–1910)

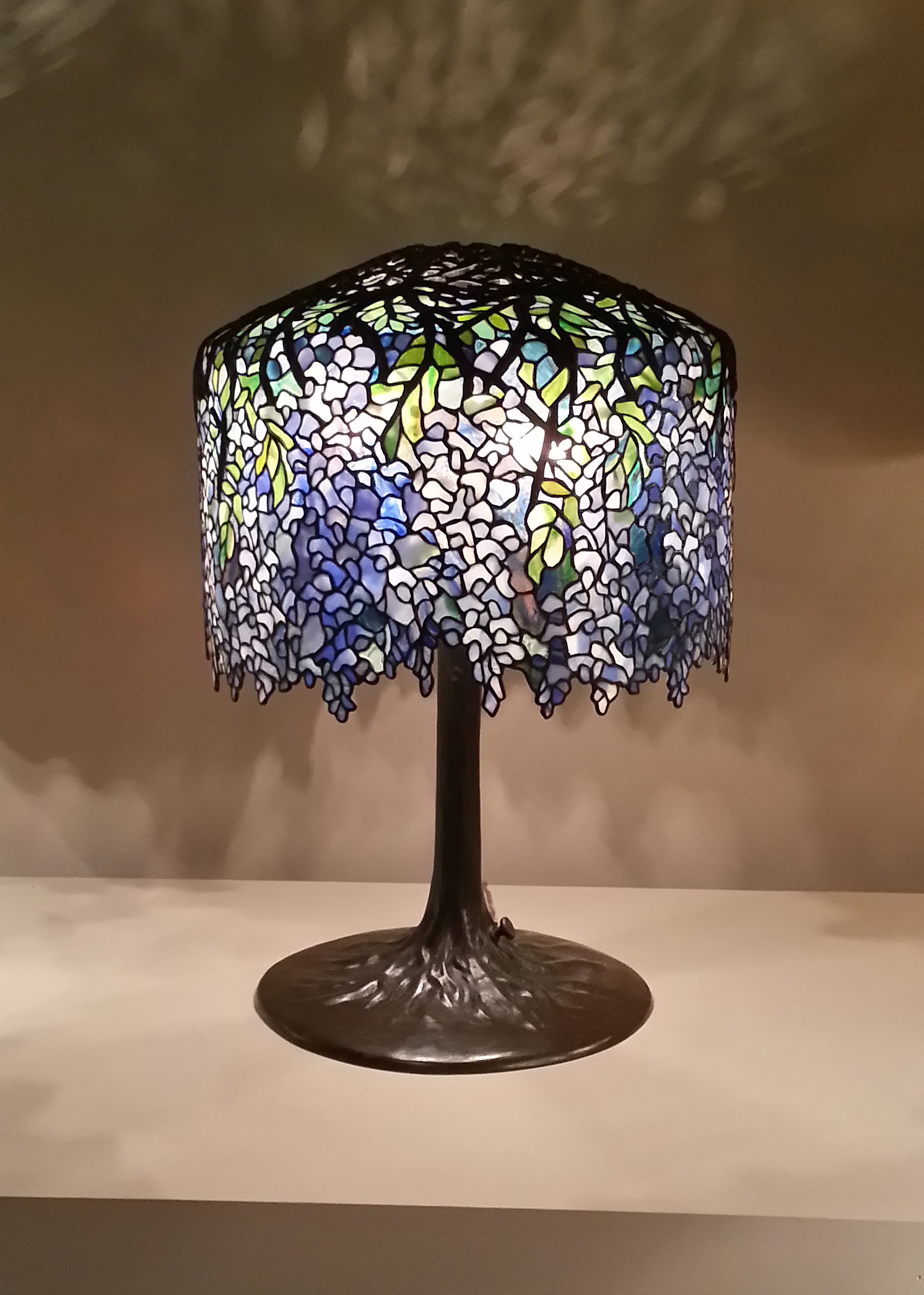
Wisteria table lamp by Driscoll for Tiffany (1902)

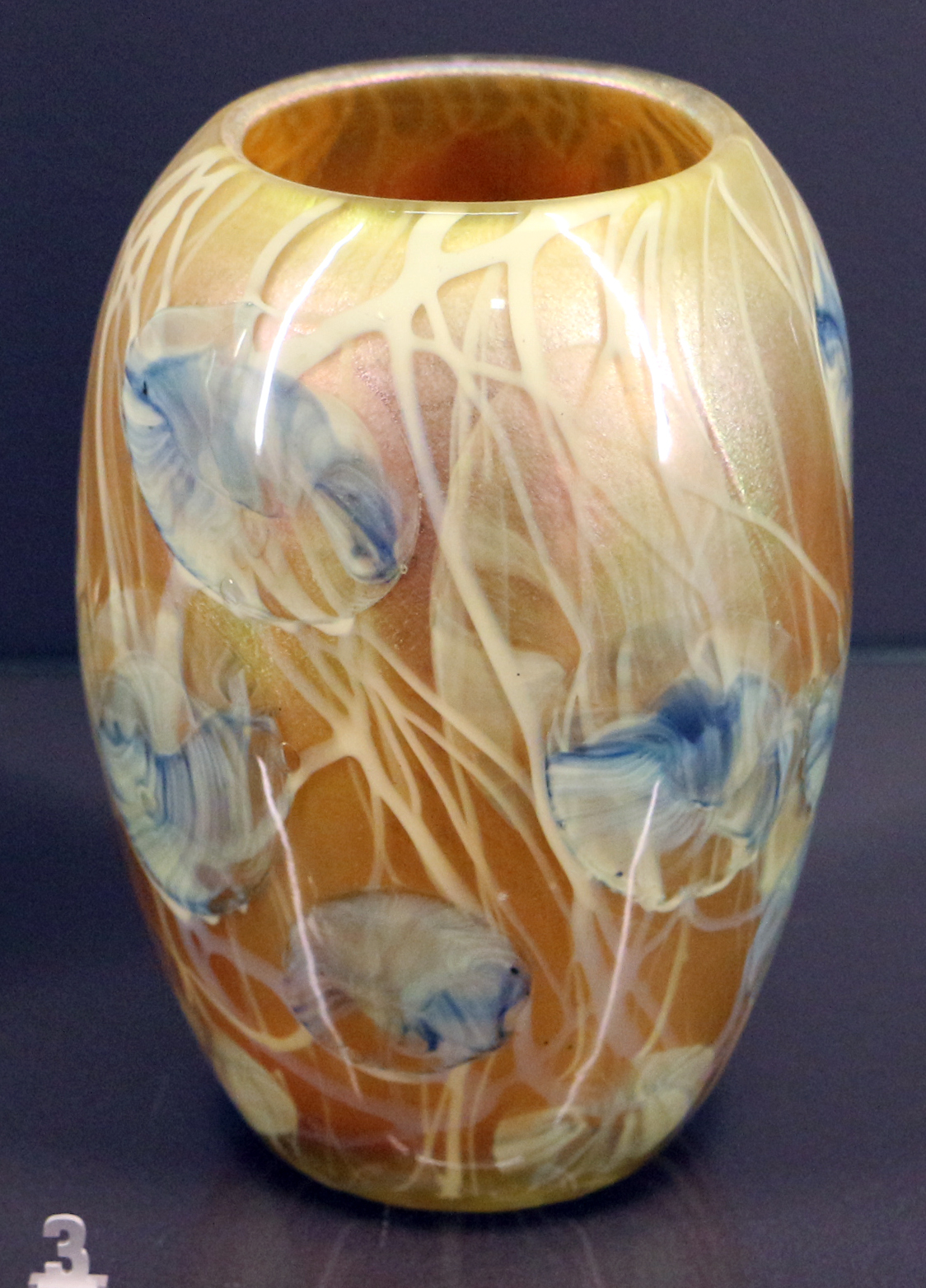
Iridescent vase by Tiffany (1904)

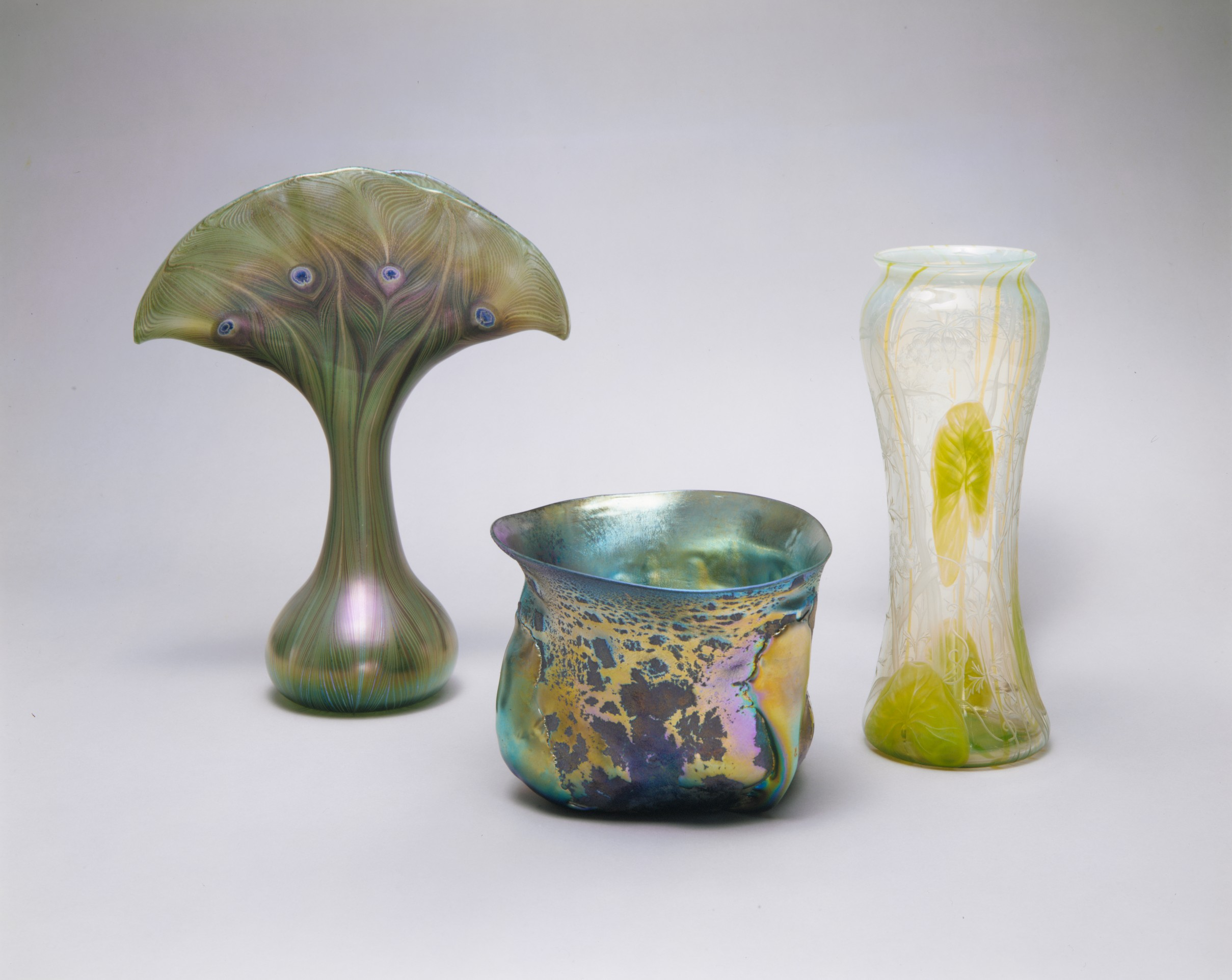
Favrile glass by Tiffany (1907) (Metropolitan Museum of Art, New York City)

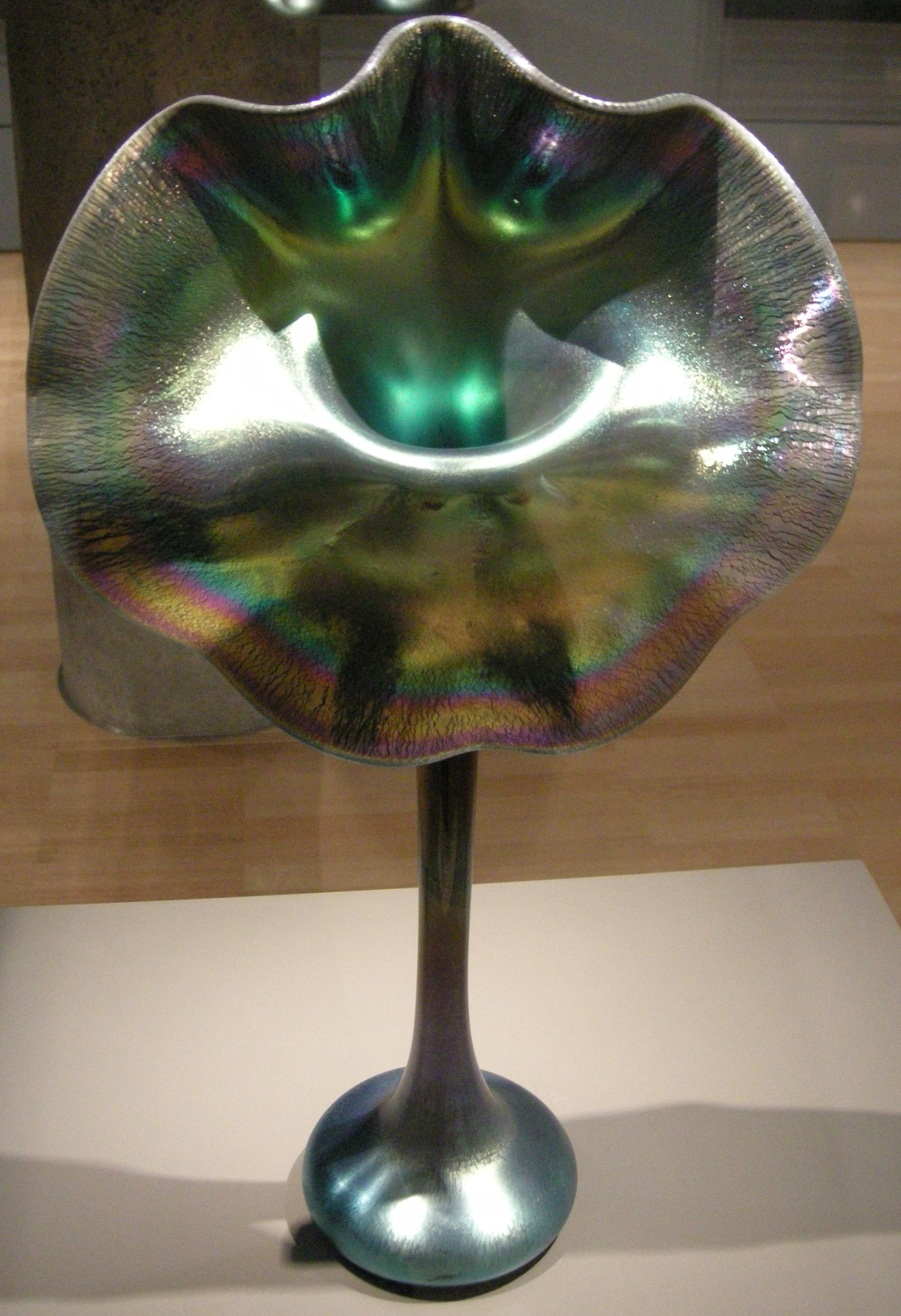
Jack-in-the-pulpit vase by Tiffany (1910)

== Austria ==
Glass, particularly stained glass windows, played a significant part in the Vienna Secession. Unlike the glass art of the Art Nouveau in France, the Secession glass designs were geometric and abstract, without the curving lines and natural forms of the earlier style. Leopold Forstner was an important artist in this domain, working closely with Otto Wagner and other architects. He designed the windows for the Austrian Postal Savings Bank, one of the landmarks of the Vienna Secession style, and also for the St. Charles Borromeo Cemetery Church, the most notable of Vienna Secession churches.

Another notable glass designer of the Vienna Secession was the architect Otto Prutscher, who was part of the Wiener Werkstätte created highly abstract and geometric forms for the far removed from the natural forms of the early Art Nouveau.

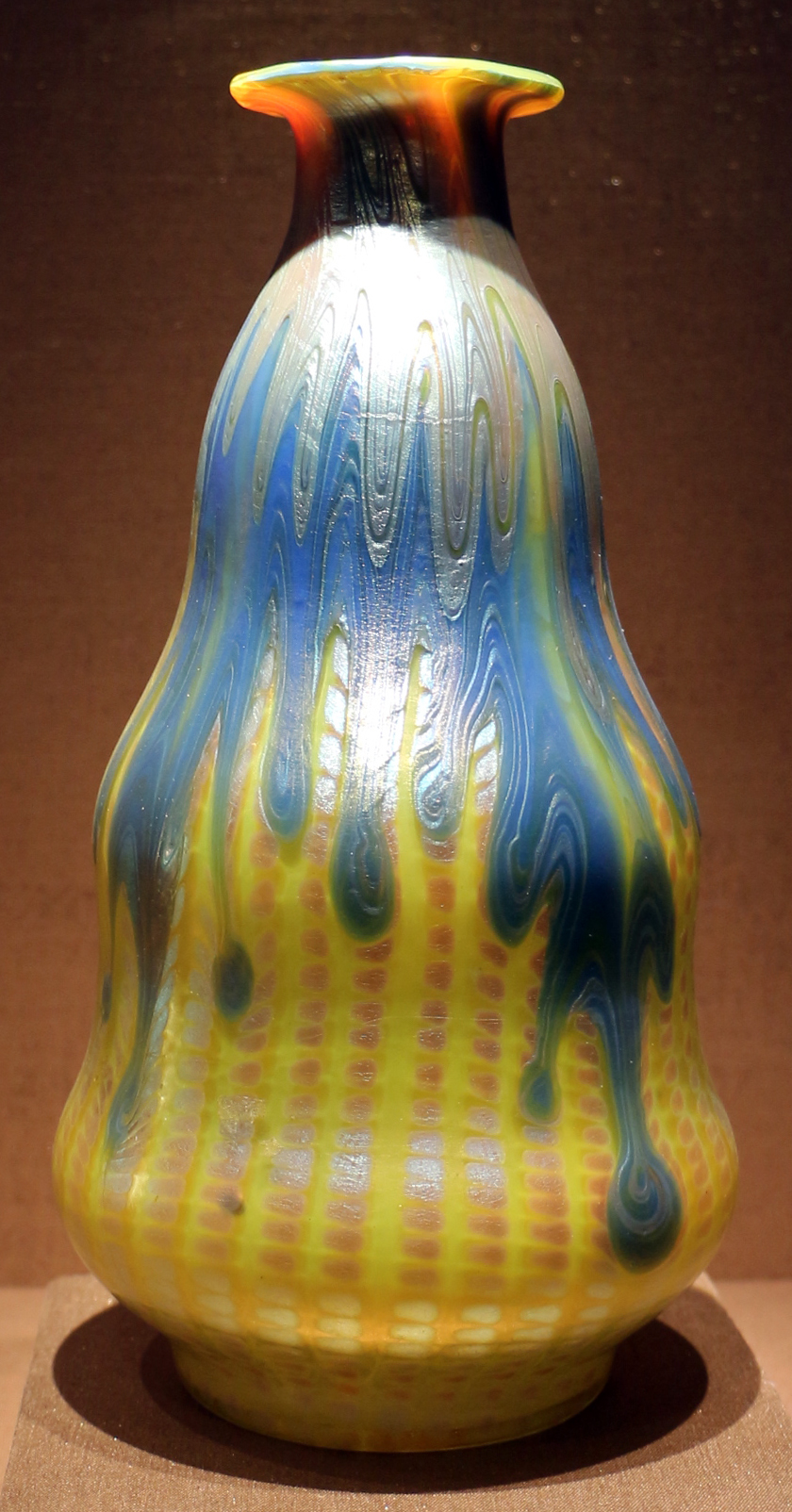
Vase by Johann Loetz Witwe (1900)

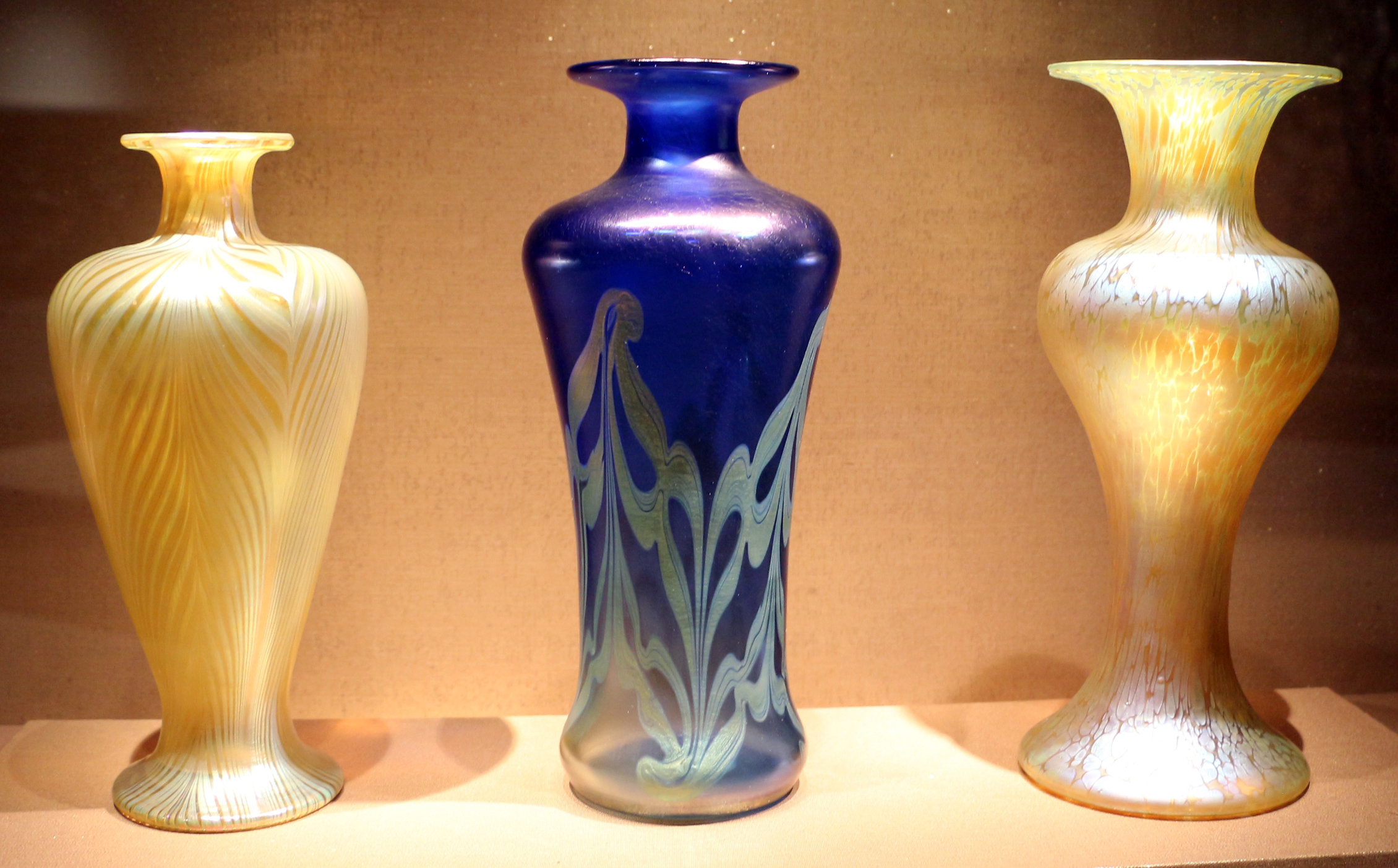
Iridescent vases by Johann Loetz Witwe (1900)

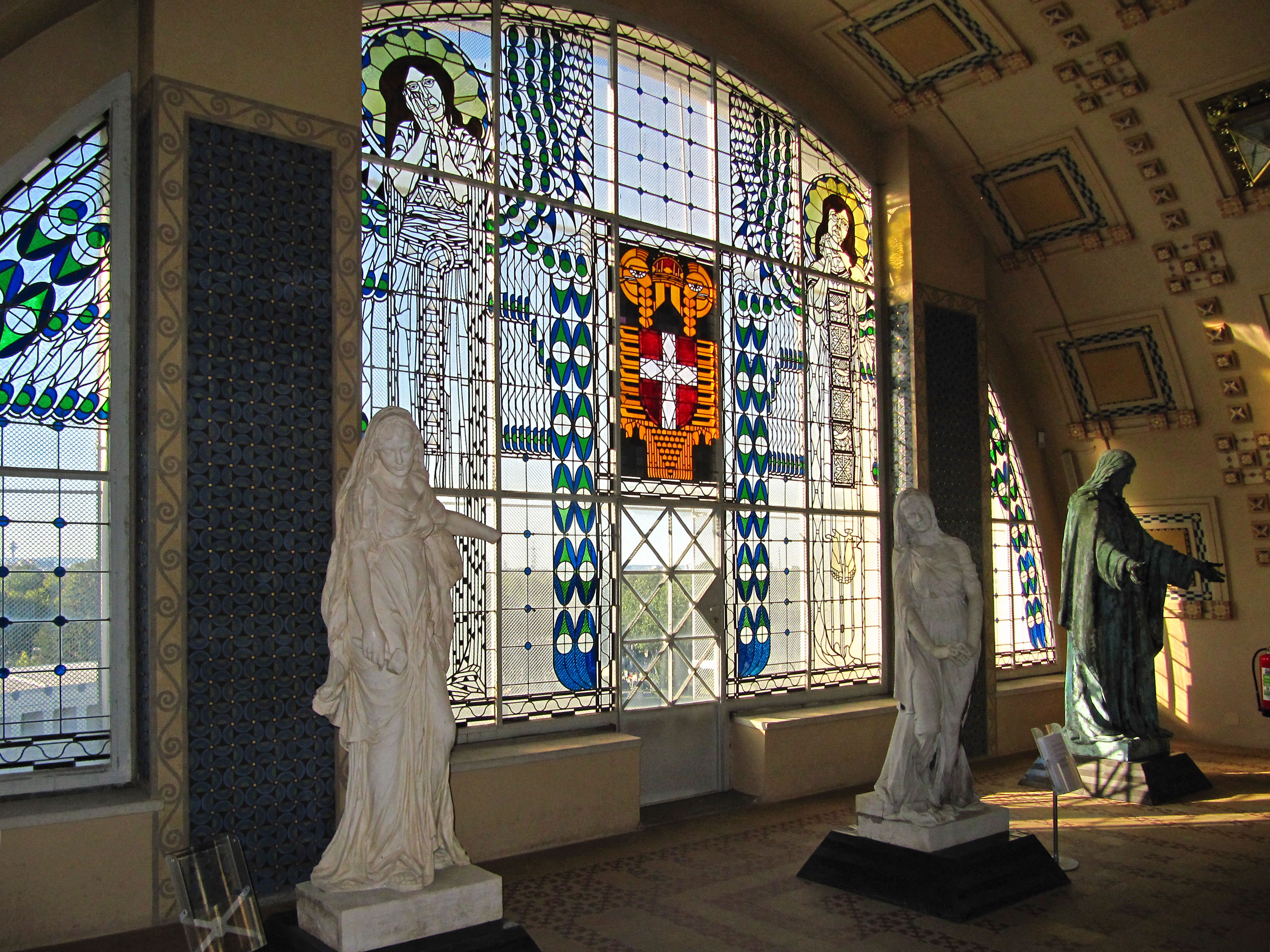
Stained glass window of St. Charles Borromeo Cemetery Church in Vienna by Leopold Forstner (1908–1911)

== Belgium ==
=== Philippe Wolfers, Serrurier-Bovy, and Val Saint Lambert ===
One of the leading Belgian art glass designers was Philippe Wolfers, whose work included Les Chardons ("The Thistles") vase in 1896 and a more abstract Crépuscule ("Twilight") vase in 1901. The Belgian designer Gustave Serrurier-Bovy created vases and other works that were similar to the Secession style, made of metal and glass in geometric forms. The Belgian crystal firm of Val Saint Lambert produced crystal Art Nouveau vases in more traditional floral designs. The architect Victor Horta also created stained glass designs for his interiors (see Stained glass windows section below).

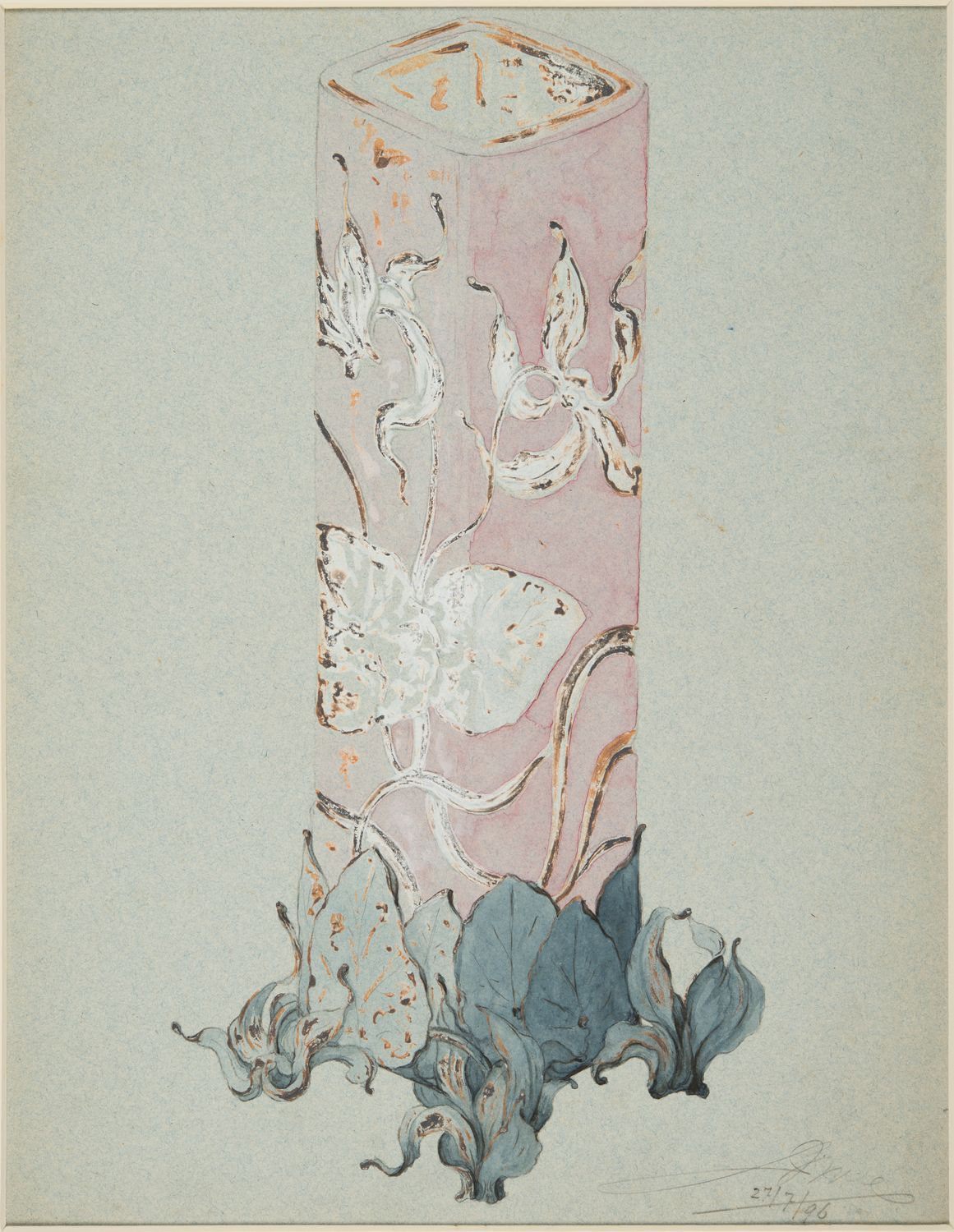
Drawing for Les Chardons ("The Thistles") vase by Philippe Wolfers (1896)

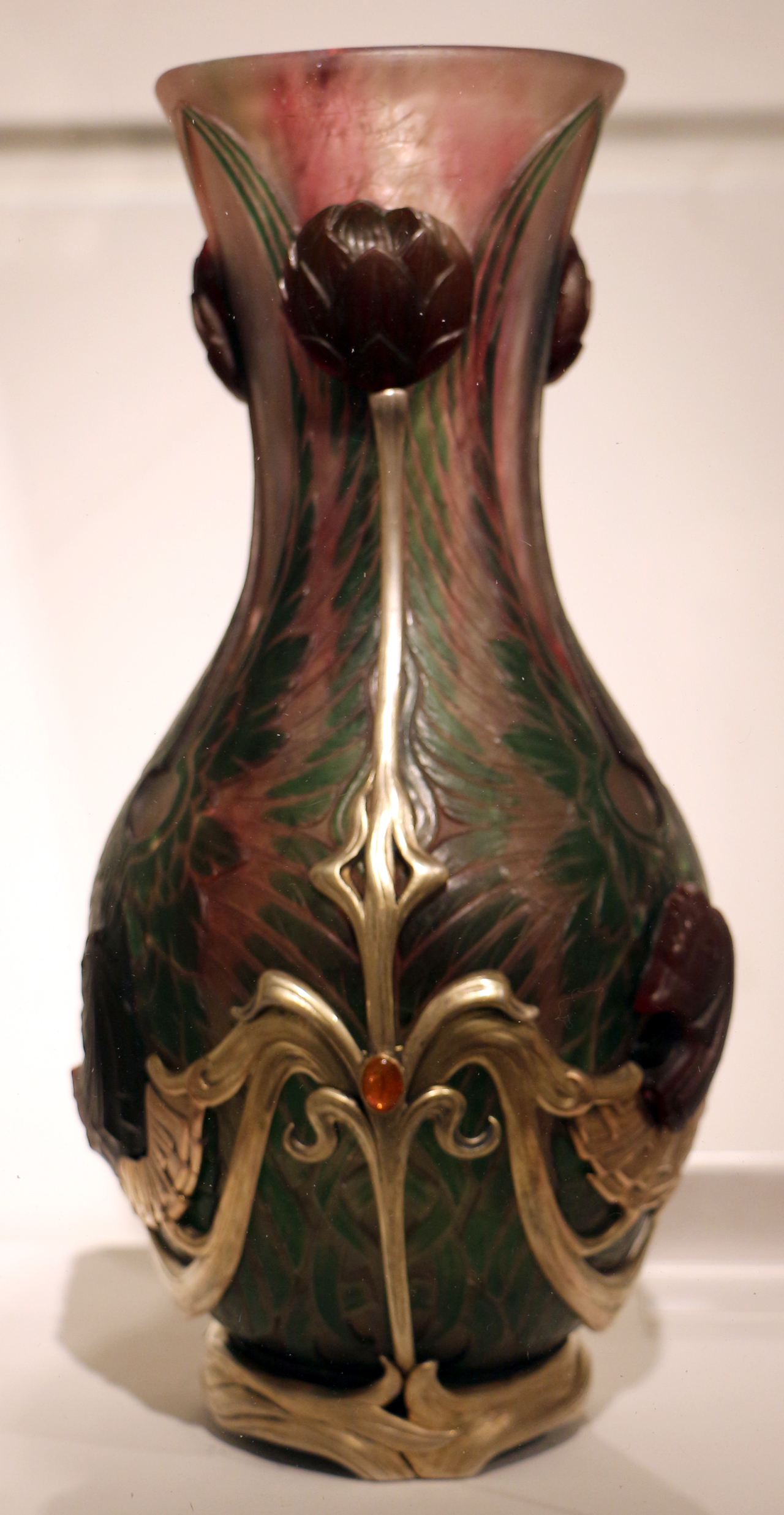
Vase by Wolfers (1899)

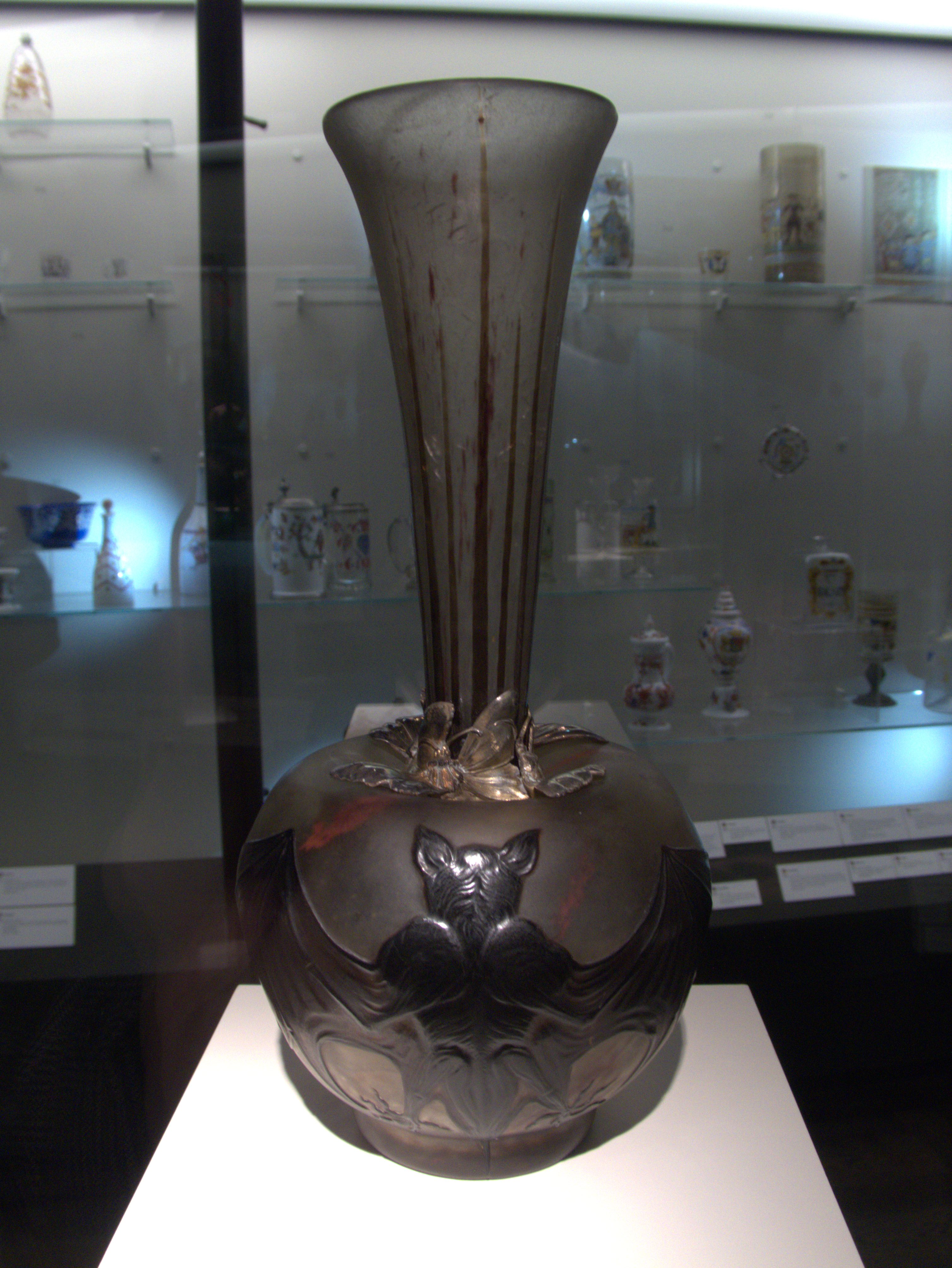
Crépuscule ("Twilight") vase with bat design by Wolfers (1901)

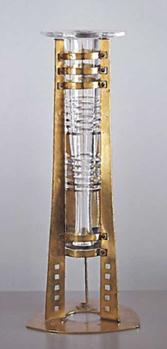
Vase by Gustave Serrurier-Bovy (1904) (Metropolitan Museum of Art)

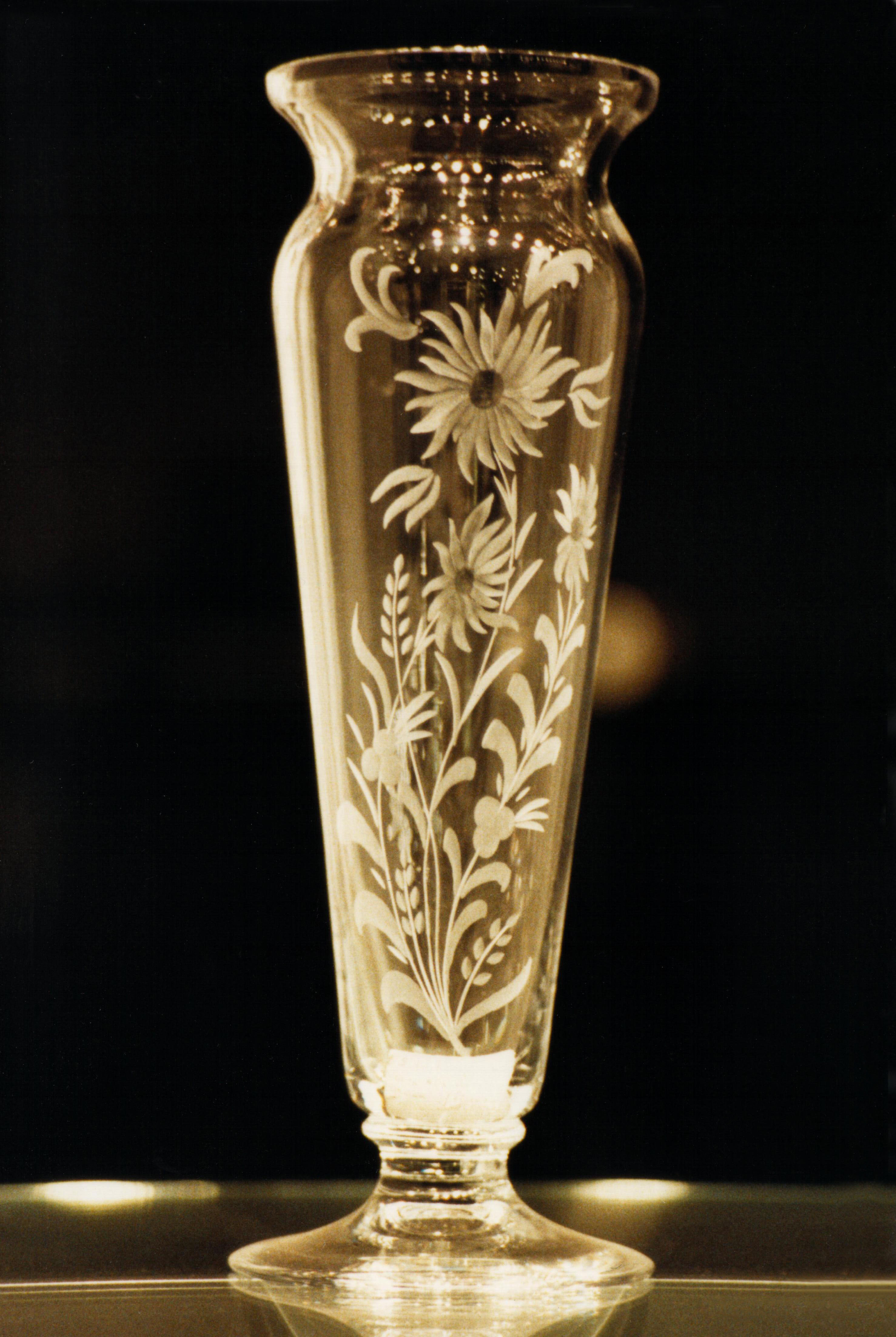
White crystal vase with engraved floral design by Val Saint Lambert

== United Kingdom ==
The Scottish artist Christopher Dresser, from Glasgow, was a leading figure in Art Nouveau glass in the United Kingdom. Unlike most glass artists of the time, he showed little interest in purely natural forms such as plants and flowers. He was a member of the movement known as Aestheticism, and also was associated with Symbolism and the Anglo-Japanese style, which adapted Japanese aesthetics to European subjects.

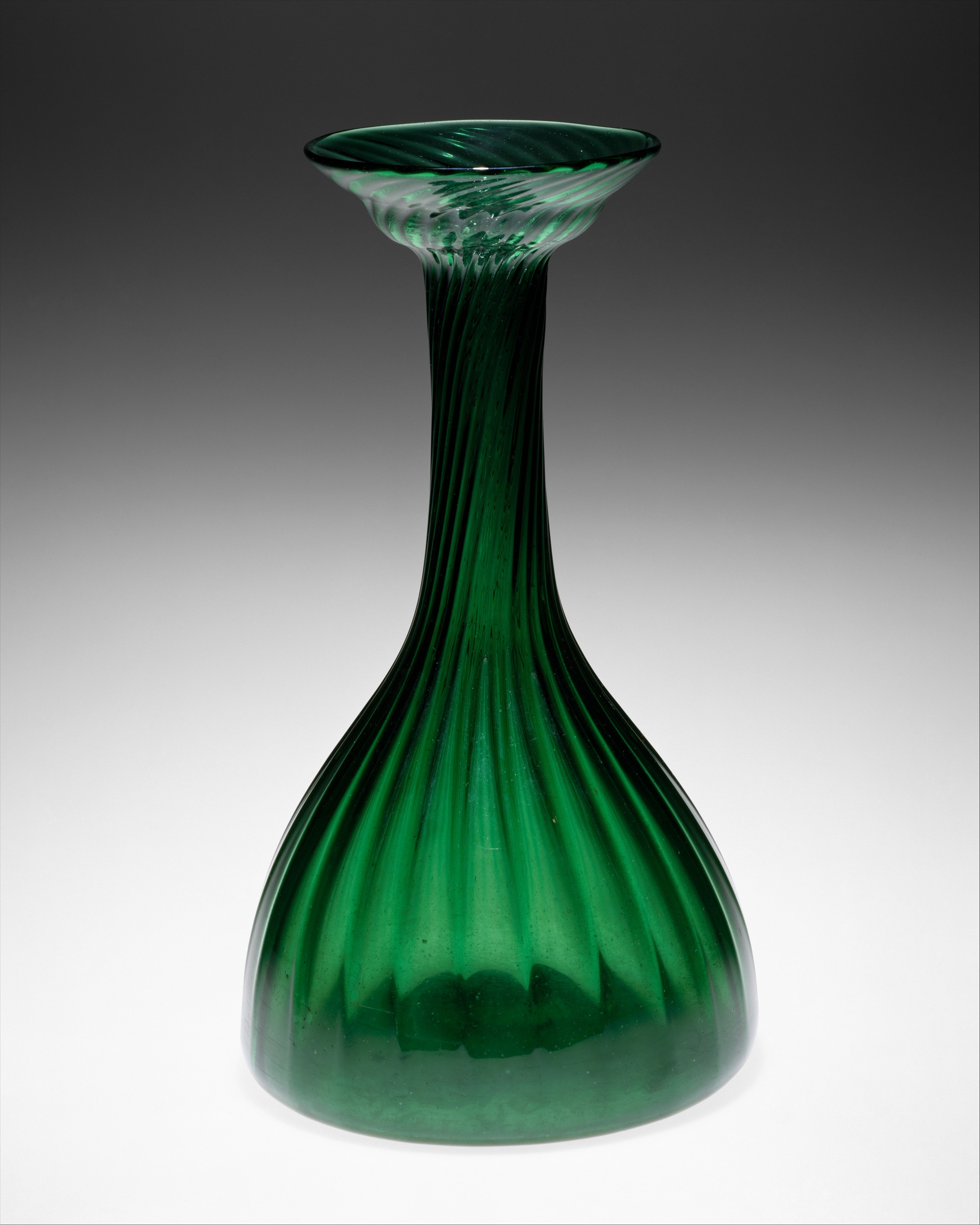
Clutha glass vase by Christopher Dresser (1890) (Metropolitan Museum of Art)

Clutha glass vase by Dresser (1895) (Cleveland Museum of Art)

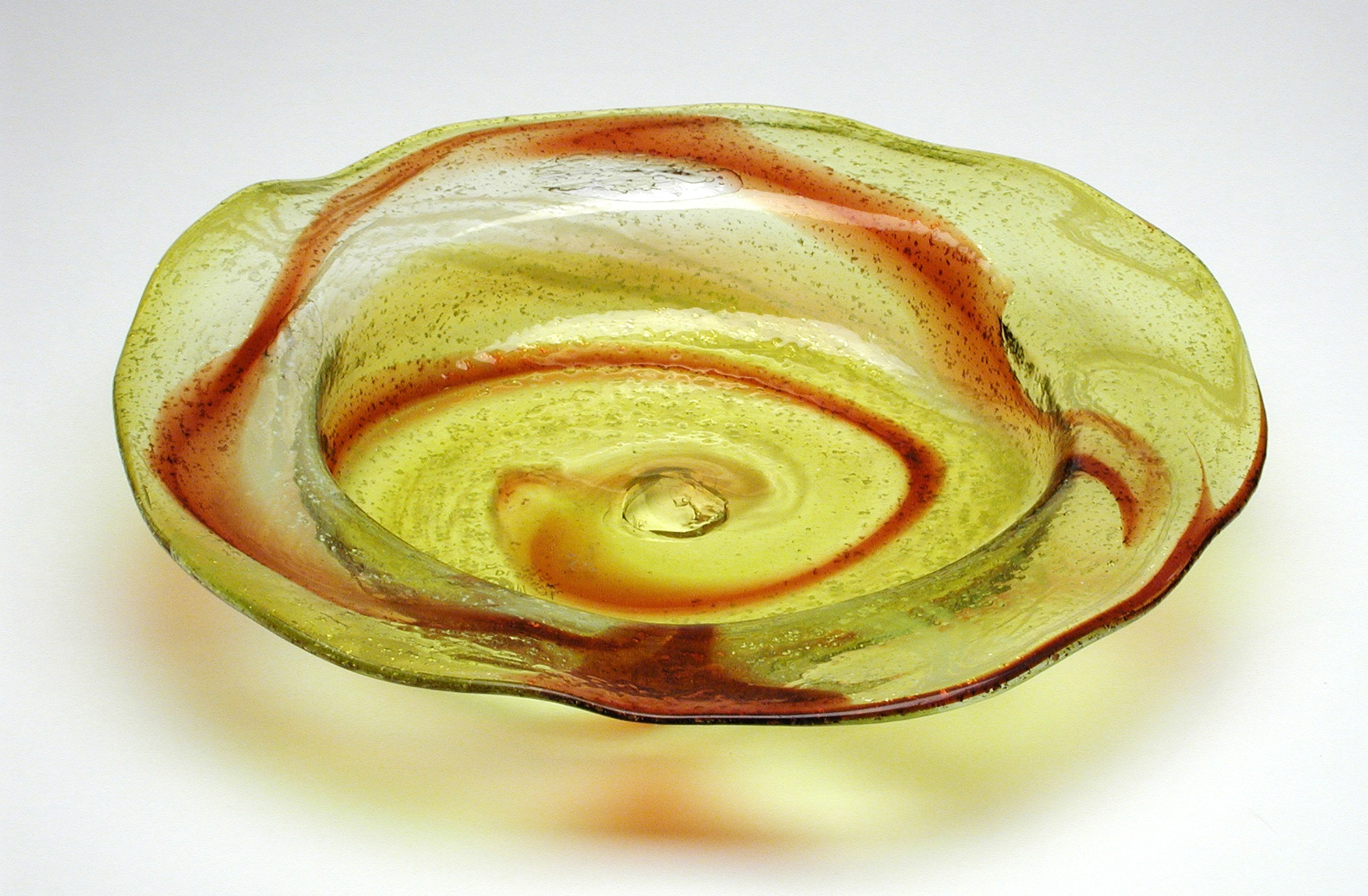
Clutha glass dish by Dresser (1890s) (Metropolitan Museum of Art)

== Stained glass windows ==
Victor Horta, the Belgian architect who designed some of the earliest Art Nouveau houses, used stained glass windows, combined with ceramics, wood and iron decoration with similar motifs, to create a harmony between functional elements and decoration, making a unified work of art. One example is the stained glass window of the doorway of the Hôtel van Eetvelde in Brussels (1895).

In France, Art Nouveau stained glass was used by Alphonse Mucha to decorate the interior of the jewelry shop of Georges Fouquet. The windows were made by Léon Fargues. The decor is now found in the Carnavalet Museum. One of the largest and last examples of Art Nouveau decorative glass in Paris is the cupola of the Galeries Lafayette Department store (1912).

Early Art Nouveau stained glass generally used traditional techniques and subjects, but usually featured floral themes and women as the central figures. The windows made by Louis Comfort Tiffany, such as those made for the "Education" window at the Yale University Library (1887–90) were particularly lavish, with painted figures. Later, as in his stained glass window of Oyster Bay, he used the Favrile glass process that he patented, in which the molten glass was tinted with metallic oxides to give its surface an iridescent effect.

Later, in Vienna, the artists of the Vienna Secession created more abstract, simpler and more geometric stained glass designs. Koloman Moser designed decorative angels for the windows of the Kirche am Steinhof, a church built by Otto Wagner (1905).

Józef Mehoffer created the windows for the eight side chapels of Fribourg Cathedral between 1895 and 1918, made by the Fribourg stained glass workshop Kirsch & Fleckner. His windows document the influences of Art Nouveau, Symbolism, Historicism and folk art. The Martyrs' Window (1898-1899) is particularly influenced by Art Nouveau. It was awarded a gold medal at the World Exhibition in Paris in 1900.

In Moscow, the Russian architect Fyodor Schechtel used stained glass windows to create the atmosphere of his most Art celebrated Nouveau house, the Ryabushinsky House, now the Gorky Museum. He also used Art Nouveau glass to create the striking lamp in the shape of a jellyfish that ornaments the main stairway.

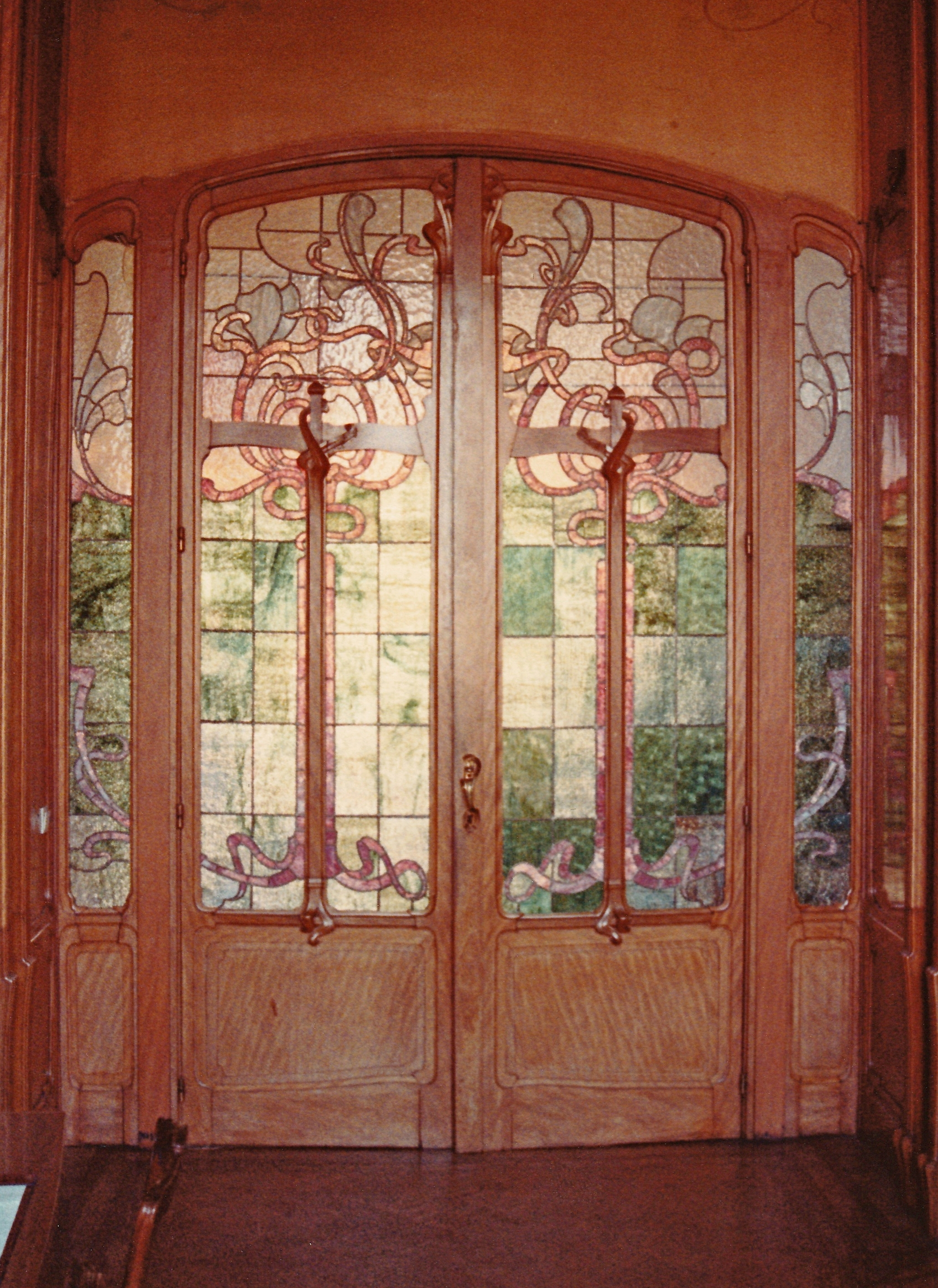
Doorway window of the Hôtel van Eetvelde in Brussels by Victor Horta (1895)

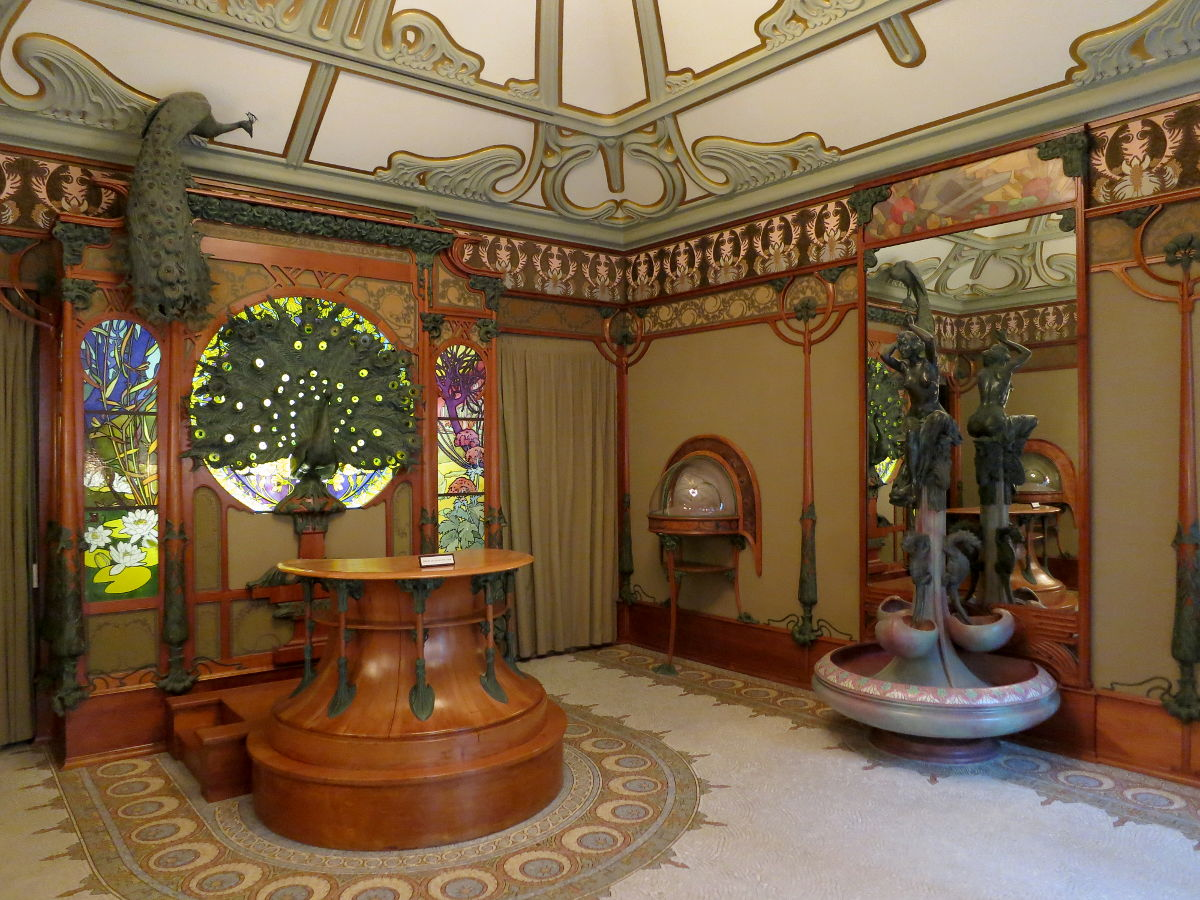
The jewellery shop of Georges Fouquet at 6, rue Royale, Paris, designed by Alphonse Mucha, now in the Carnavalet Museum (1901)

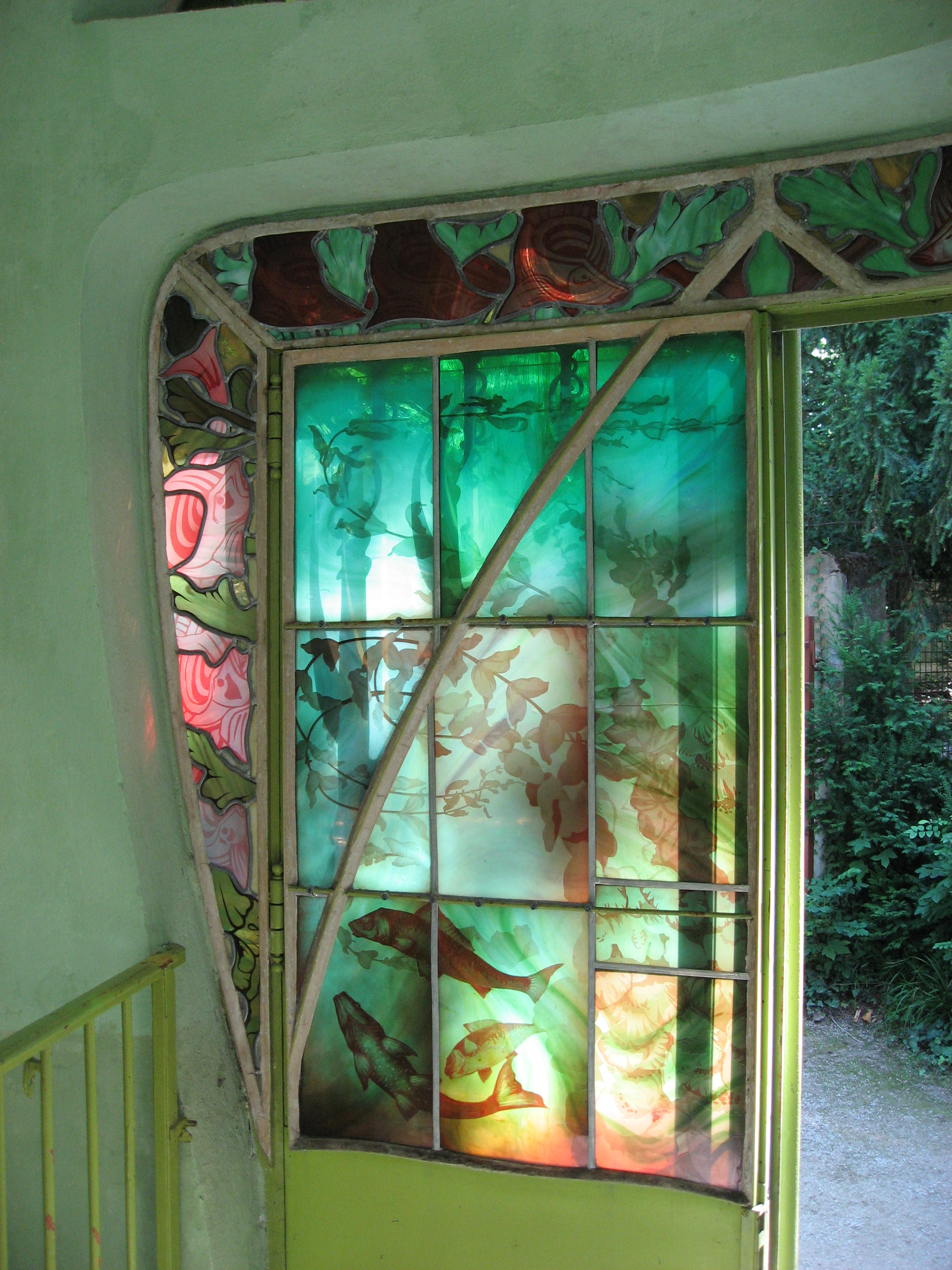
Aquarium window by Jacques Gruber (1904), (Musée de l'Ecole de Nancy)

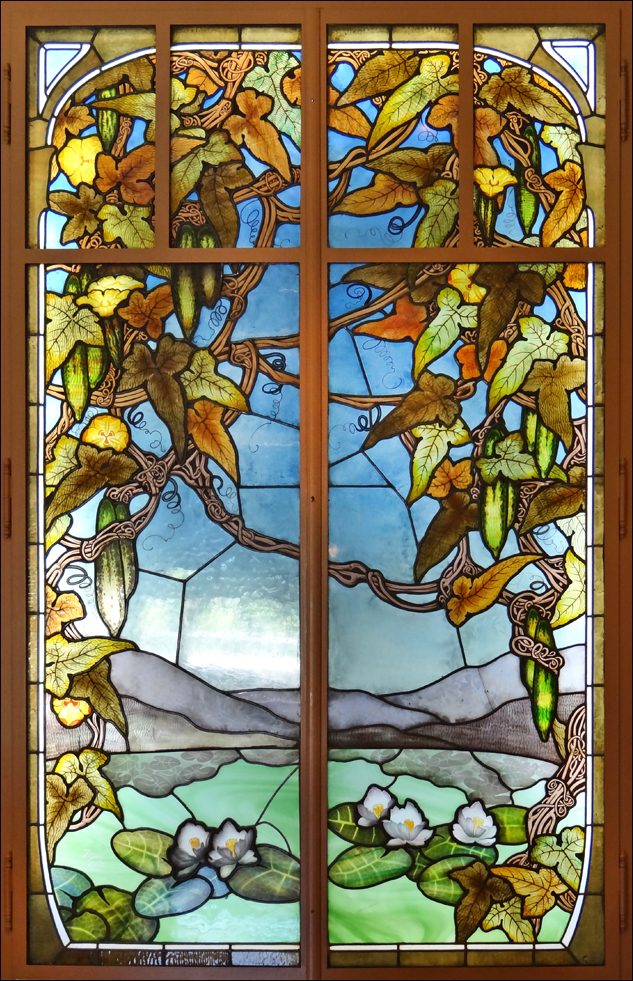
Window by Jacques Gruber (1908–09) (Musée de l'Ecole de Nancy)

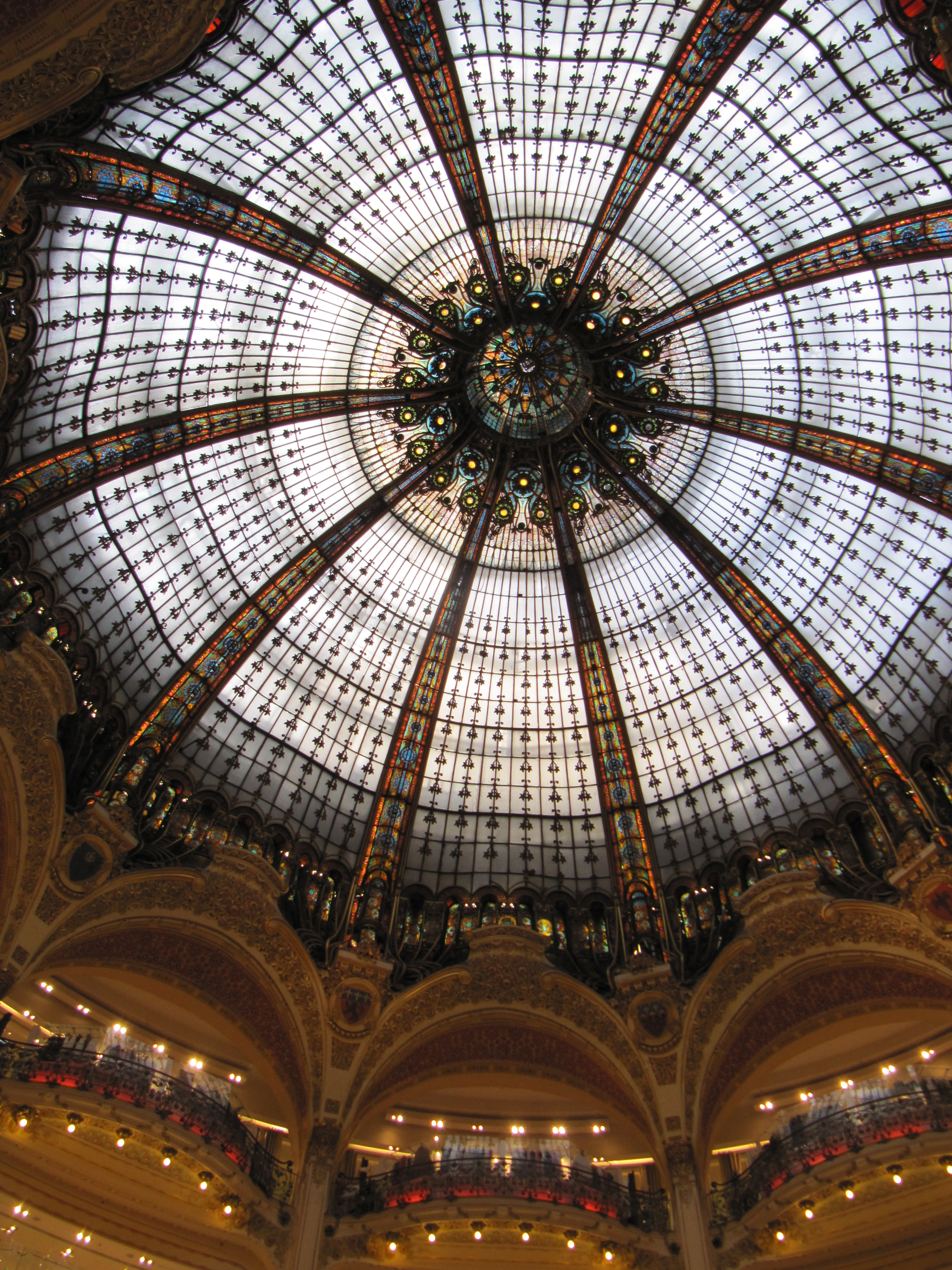
Detail of the cupola of Galeries Lafayette department store in Paris (1912)

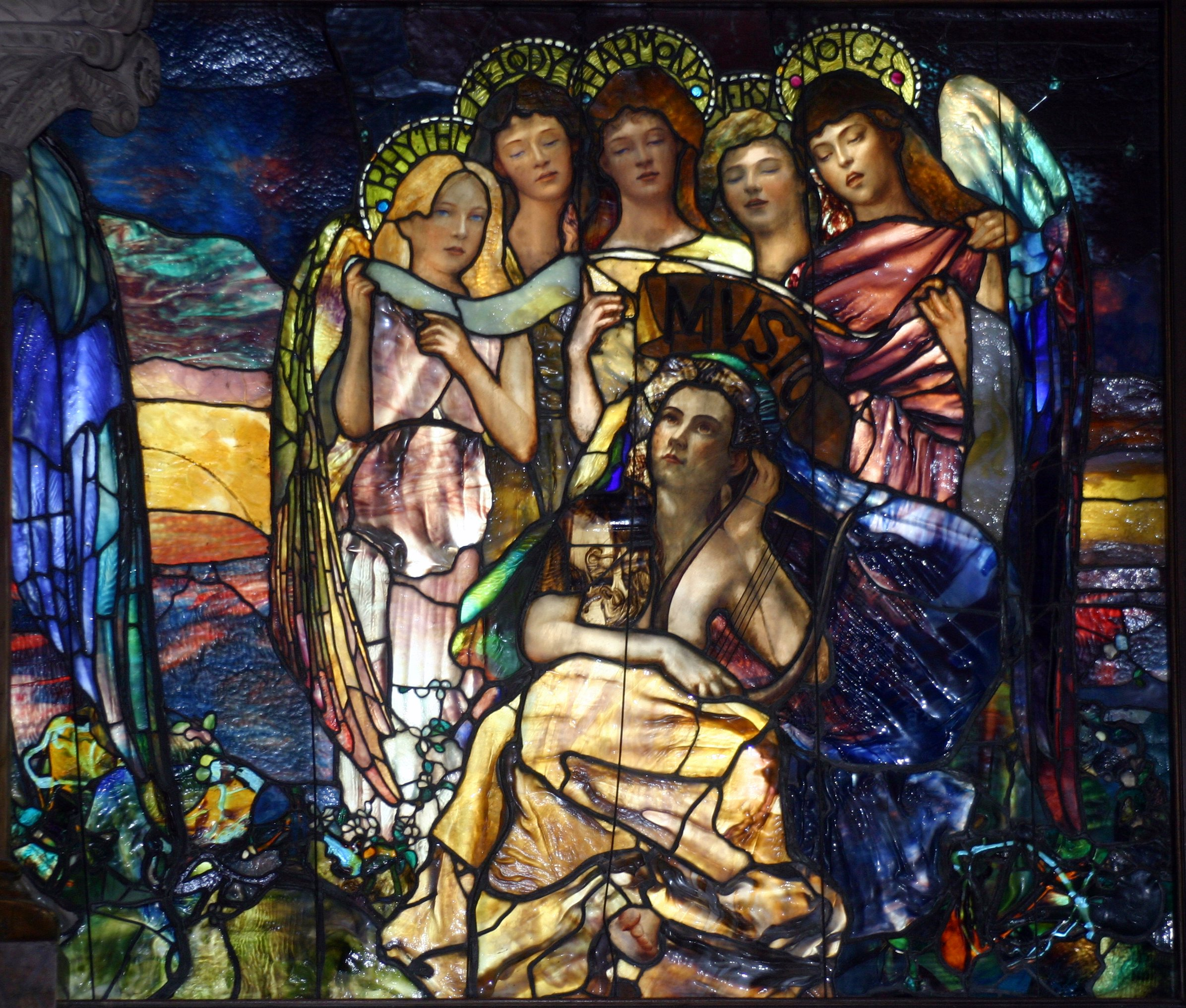
Louis Comfort Tiffany. Panel depicting Music in the larger work Education in the Yale University Library (1887–1890)

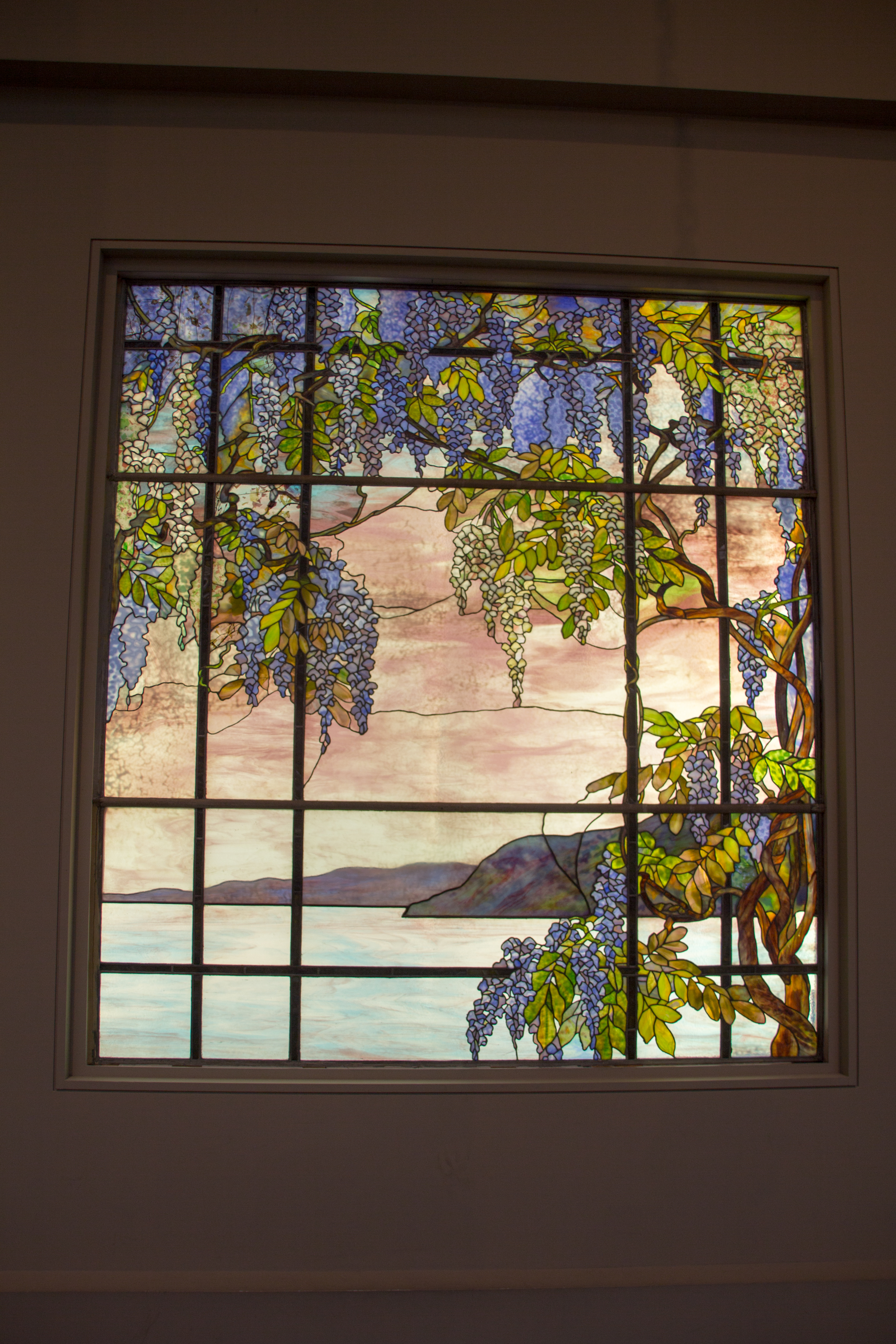
View of Oyster Bay by Tiffany (1908) (Metropolitan Museum of Art)

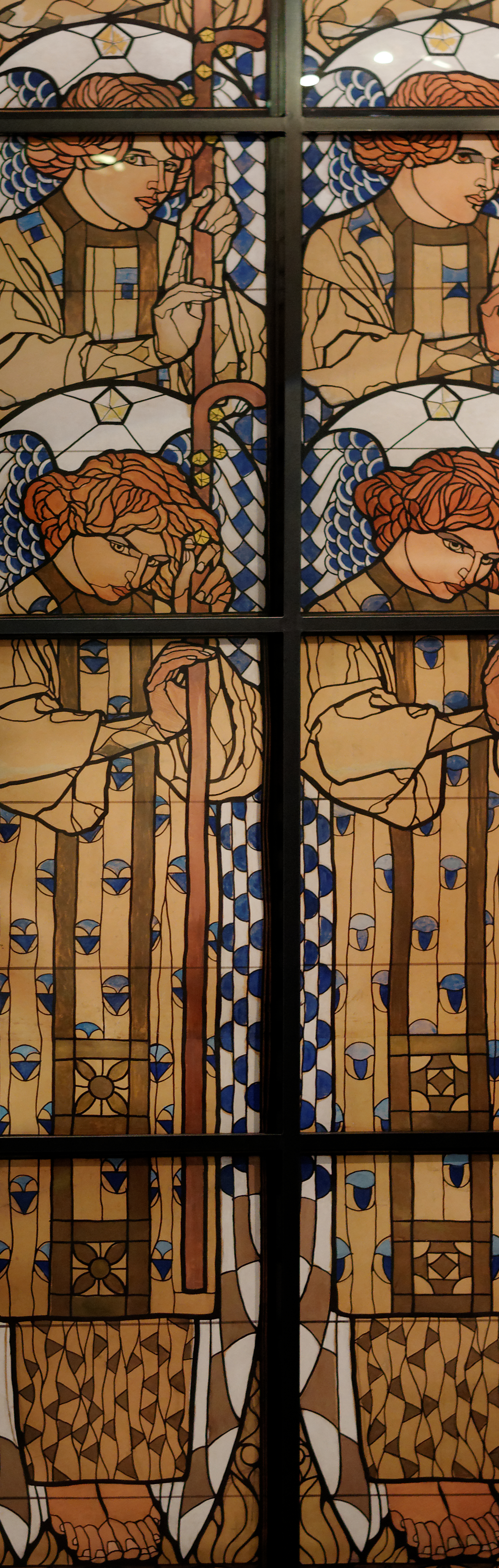
Koloman Moser design for Angel Window (1905)

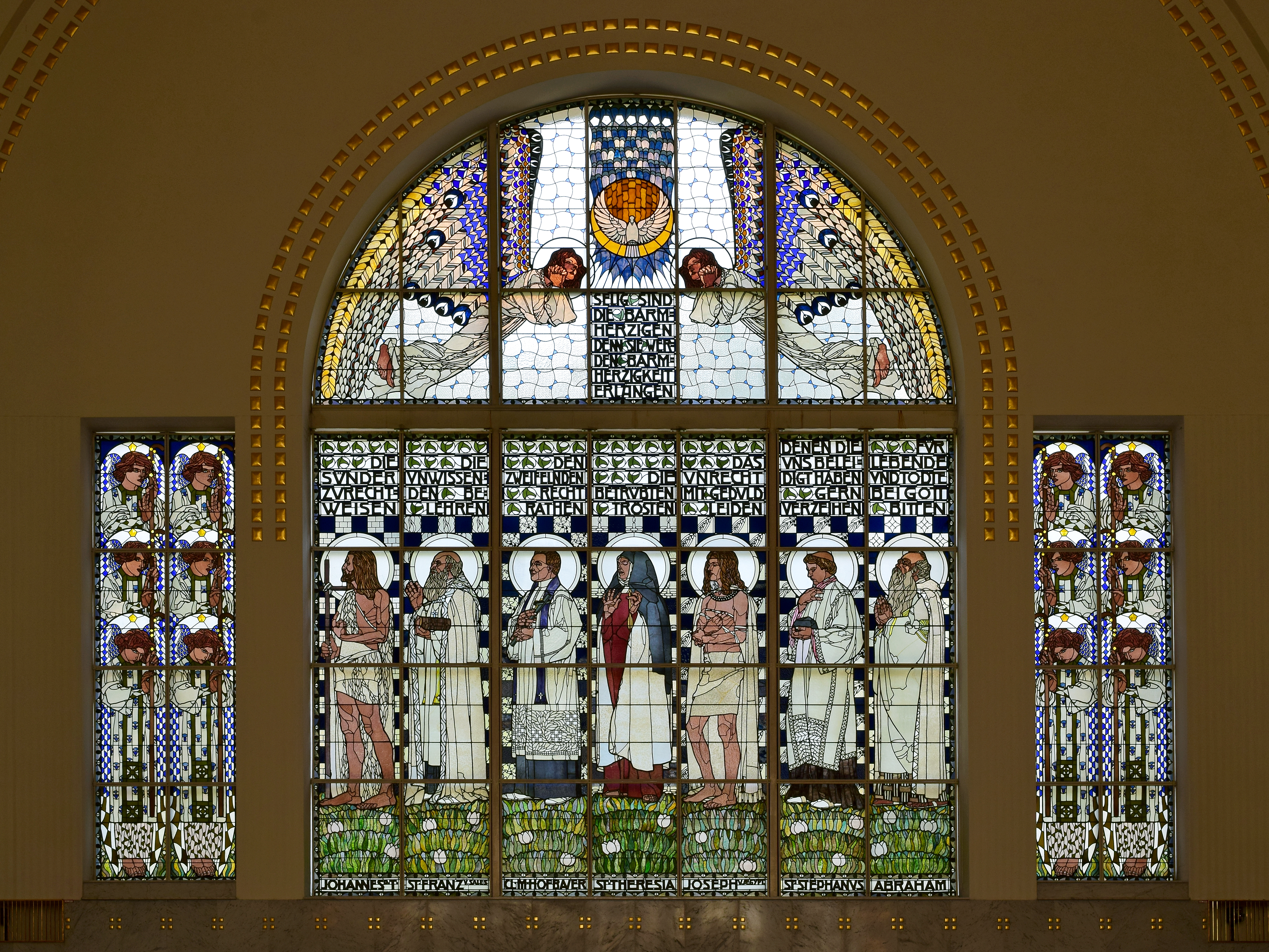
Stained glass windows by Koloman Moser for the Kirche am Steinhof in Vienna, by Otto Wagner (1905)

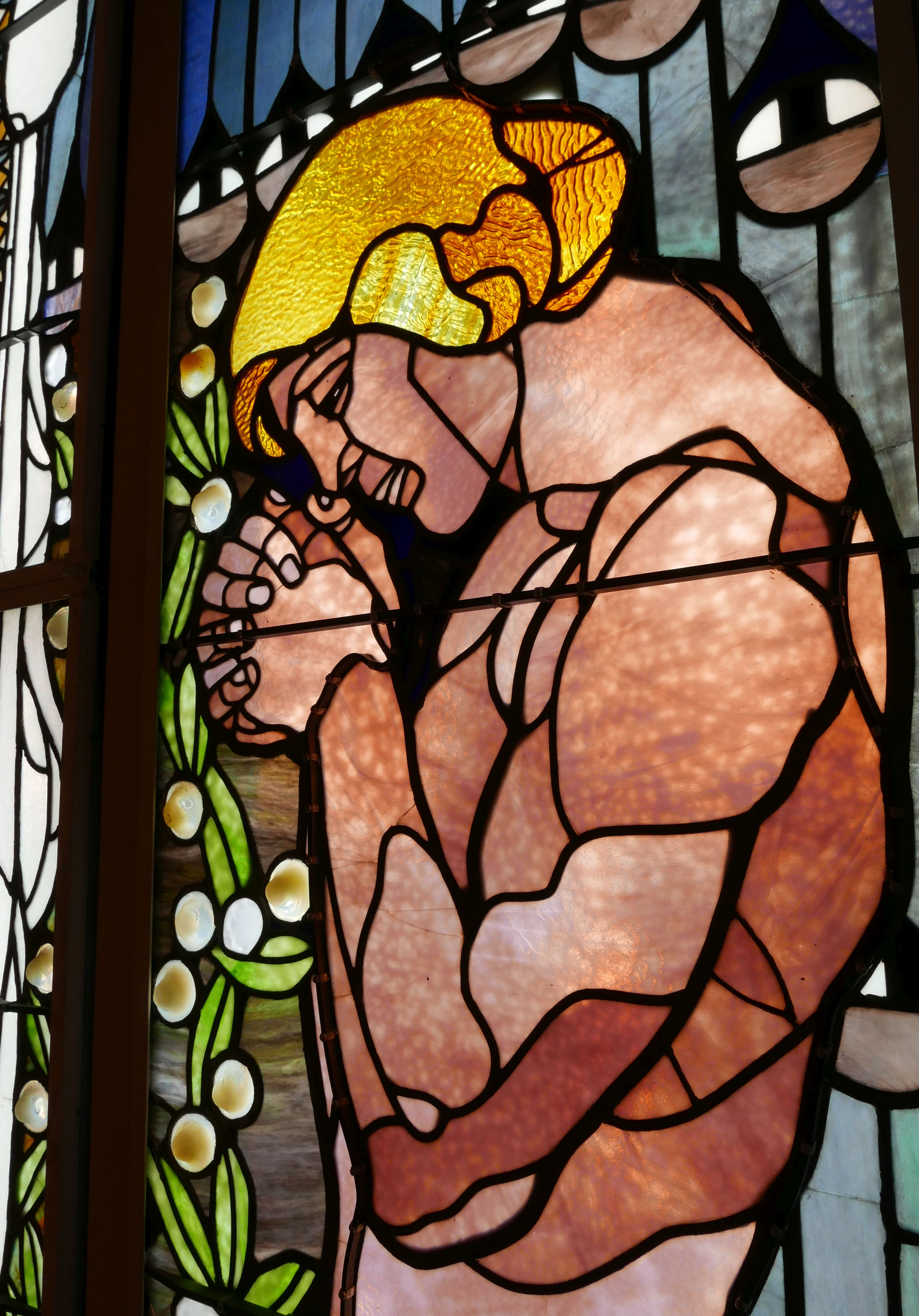
Adam by Koloman Moser for the Kirche am Steinhof by Wagner (1905)

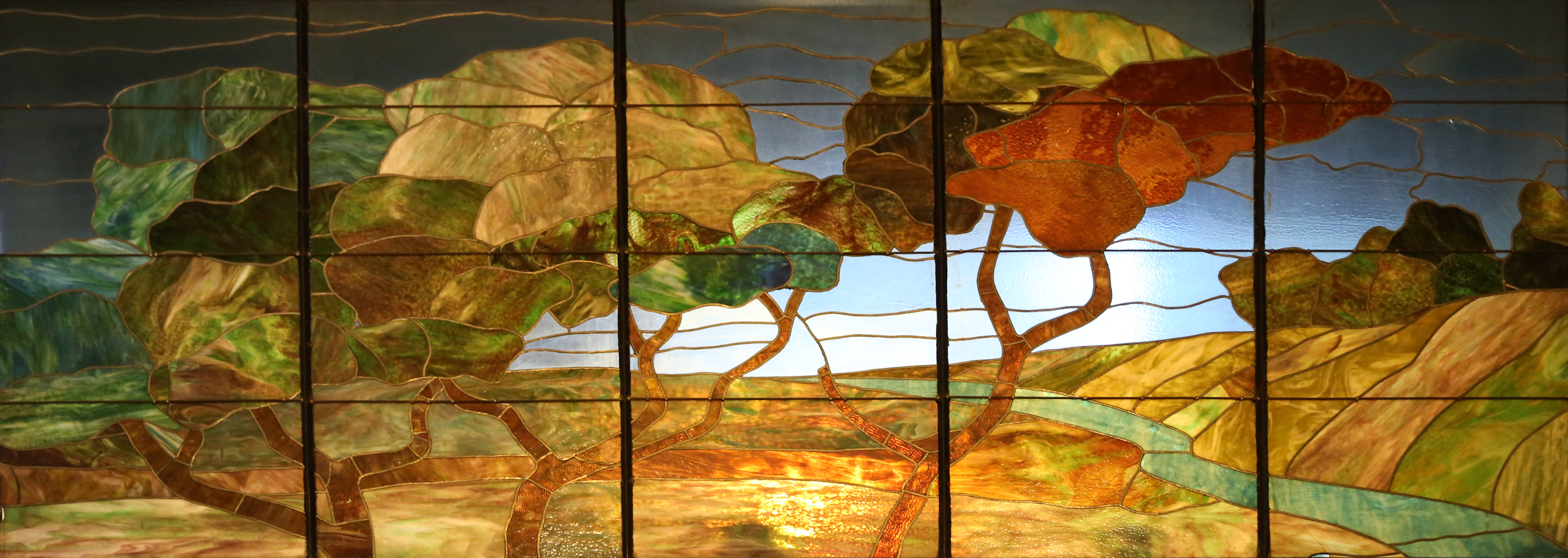
Window in antechamber of the Ryabushinsky House in Moscow, by Fyodor Schechtel (1900–1902)

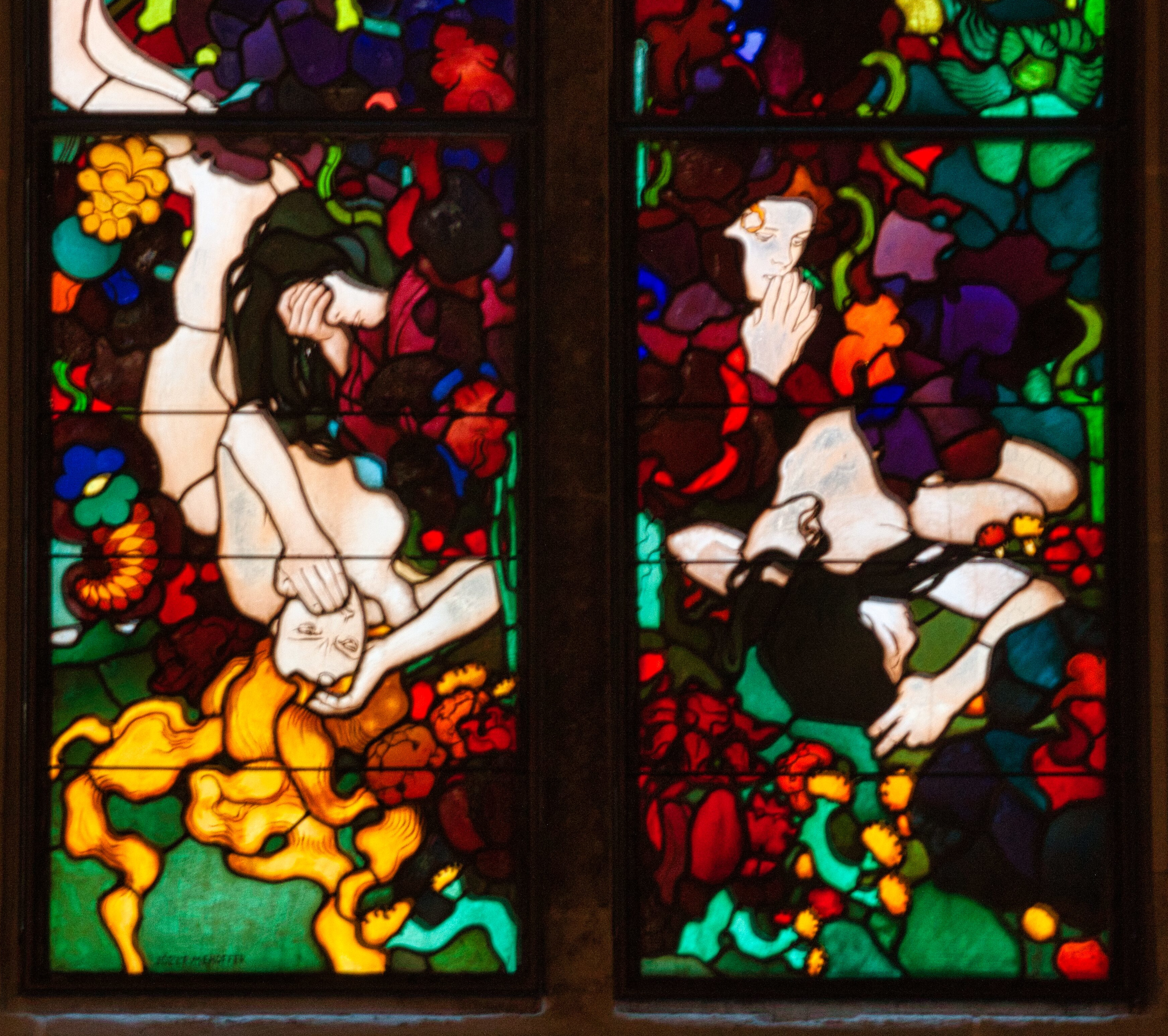
Dying Catherina and Barbara, detail from the Martyrs windows in Fribourg Cathedral, by Józef Mehoffer (1898–99)

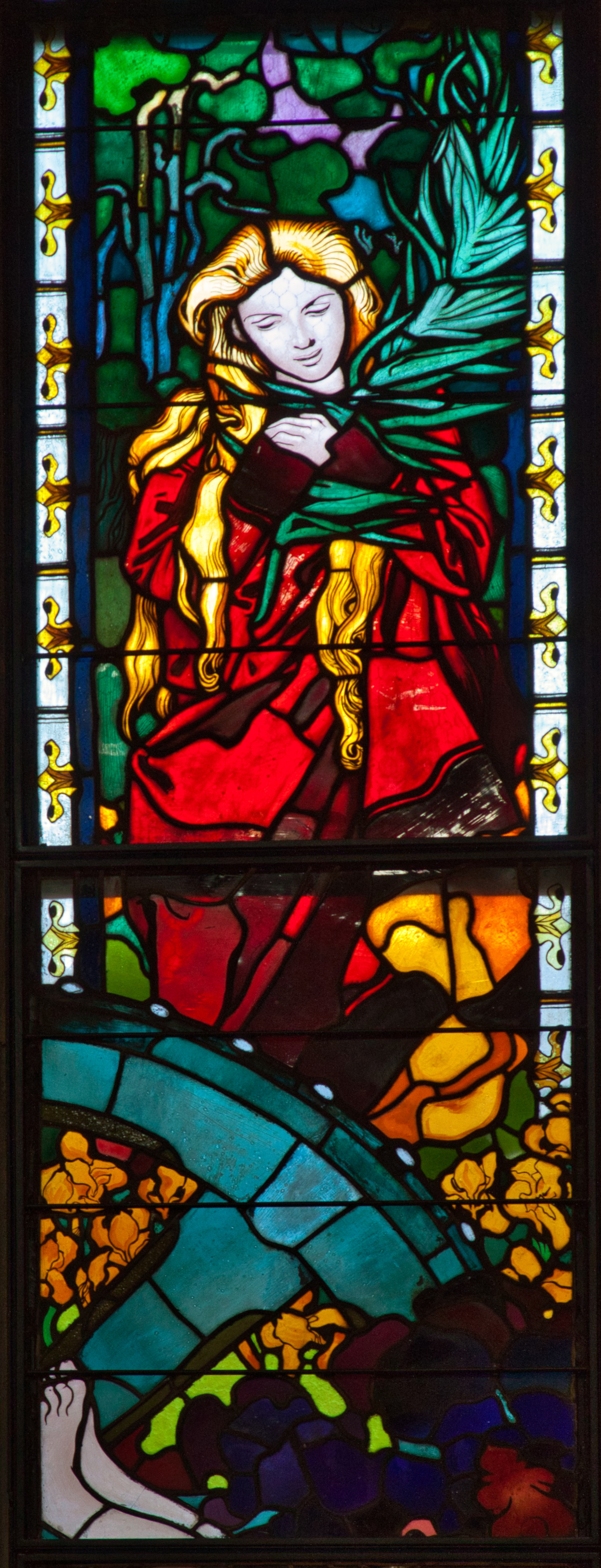
Catherine, detail from the Martyrs windows in Fribourg Cathedral, by Mehoffer (1898–99)

== Bibliography ==
- Bloch-Dermant, Janine (1980). The Art of French Glass (1860-1914). The Vendome Press. ISBN 0-86565-000-4.
- Fahr-Becker, Gabriele (2015). L'Art Nouveau (in French). H.F. Ullmann. ISBN 978-3-8480-0857-5.
- Garner, Philippe (1976). Gallé (in French). Flammarion. ISBN 2-08-012956-2.
- Thomas, Valerie (2009). Le Musée de l'École de Nancy (in French). Somogy. ISBN 978-2-7572-0248-7.
- Sembach, Klaus-Jürgen (2013). L'Art Nouveau- L'Utopie de la Réconciliation (in French). Taschen. ISBN 978-3-8228-3005-5.
- Thiébaut, Olivier (2007). Un Ensemble Art Nouveau - La Donation Rispal (in French). Musée d'Orsay - Flammarion. ISBN 978-2-0801-1608-6.
