= Sang =

Sang or SANG may refer to:

== Organizations ==
- Saudi Arabian National Guard, Saudi Arabian military force

== Places ==
- Sang Castle, a historical castle in Kerman Province, Iran
- Sang, Kerman, a village in Kerman Province, Iran
- Sang, Northern Region, a town in Mion District, Northern Region, Ghana
- Sang, Seka, a settlement in Seka District, Bueng Kan Province, Thailand
- Sang, South Khorasan, a village in South Khorasan Province, Iran
- Sang, Uttarakhand, a settlement in Uttarkashi district, Uttarakhand state, India
- S'ang District, in Kandal Province, Cambodia

== People ==
=== Surname ===
- Sang (surname), the romanization of several Chinese surnames
- August Sang (1914–1969), Estonian poet and literary translator
- Jacob Sang (1720s–1786), 18th-century Dutch glass engraver
- Joshua Sang, Kenyan indicted by the International Criminal Court for crimes against humanity
- Julius Sang (1948–2004), Kenyan sprinter and 1972 Olympic medallist
- Lucas Sang (1961–2008), Kenyan sprinter and 1988 Olympian
- Patrick Sang (born 1964), Kenyan steeplechase runner and Olympic and world medallist
- Rosemary Chepkorir Sang, Kenyan virologist
- Stephen Sang (born 1985), Kenyan politician and current Governor of Nandi County
- George Assang (1927–1997), Australian singer and actor; surname anglicised from (Ah) Sang

=== Given name ===
- Sang (Korean name)
- Sang Lee (1954–2004), Korean American three-cushion billiards player
- Lin Sang (born 1977), Chinese archer
- Sang Phathanothai (1914–1986), Thai politician, union leader, and journalist
- Sang Nguyen (born 1960), Australian politician
- Sang Yoon, Korean American restaurateur, chef and founder of Father's Office
- Yi Sang (1910–1937), Korean writer

== Other ==
- Sang (Chinese sub-culture), is a term used to describe a Chinese youth sub-culture in which some young Chinese are seen to possess feelings of loss or even defeatism

== See also ==
- Sangha (disambiguation)
- Sangi (disambiguation)
