= Engraved glass =

Type of decorated glass

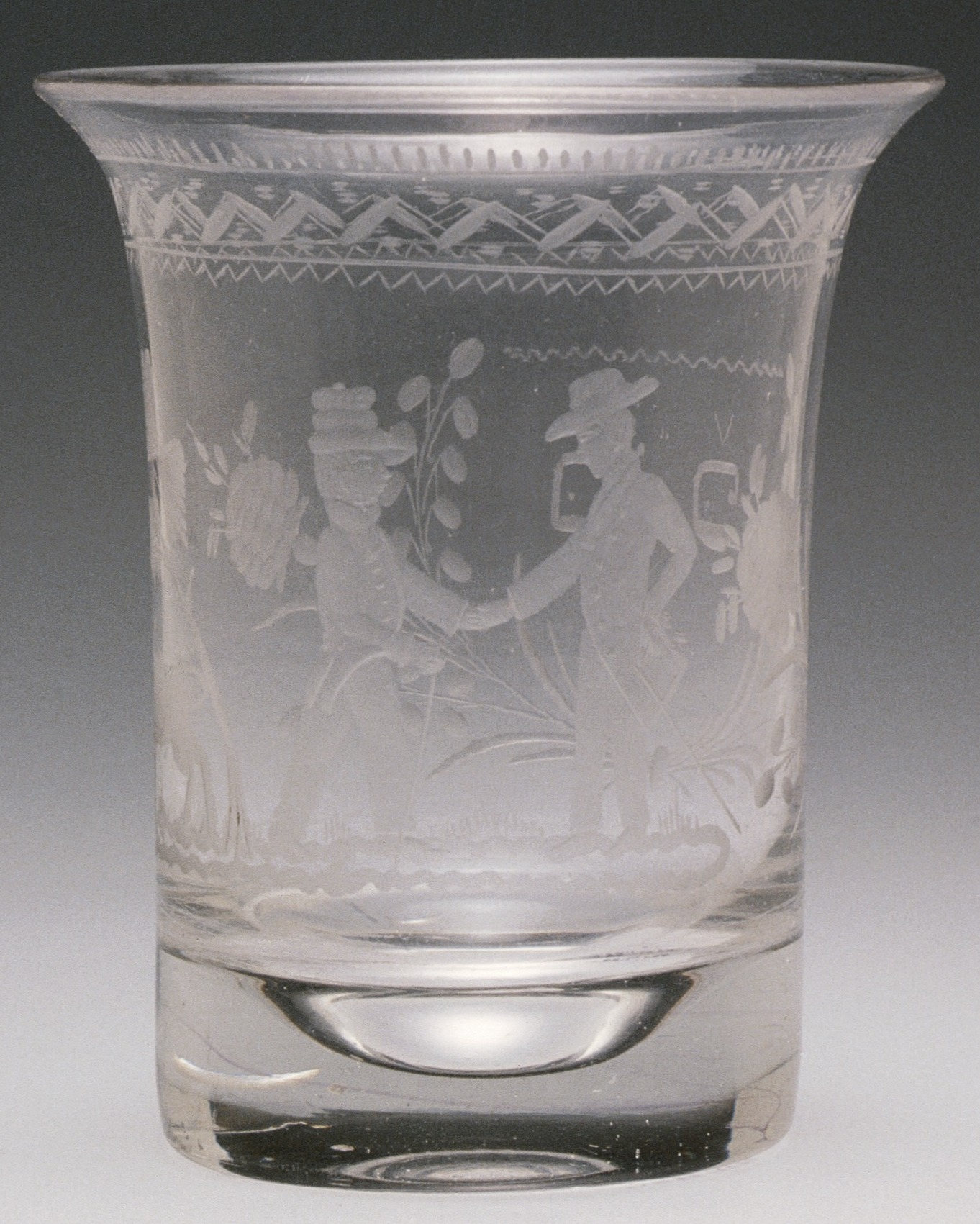
Beaker with soldier and civilian shaking hands, Bohemian glass, later 19th century.

Engraved glass is a type of decorated glass that involves shallowly engraving the surface of a glass object, either by holding it against a rotating wheel, or manipulating a "diamond point" in the style of an engraving burin. It is a subgroup of glass art, which refers to all artistic glass, much of it made by "hot" techniques such as moulding and blowing melting glass. Glass engraving is one of the "cold" techniques, working on formed and cooled glass. The other main techniques in the cold group are glass etching which uses acidic, caustic, or abrasive substances to achieve artistic effects, and cut glass, which is cut with an abrasive wheel, but more deeply than in engraved glass, where the engraving normally only cuts deeply enough into the surface to leave a mark. Usually, engraved surfaces are left "frosted" so a difference is visible, while in cut glass the cut surface is polished to restore transparency. Some pieces may combine two or more techniques.

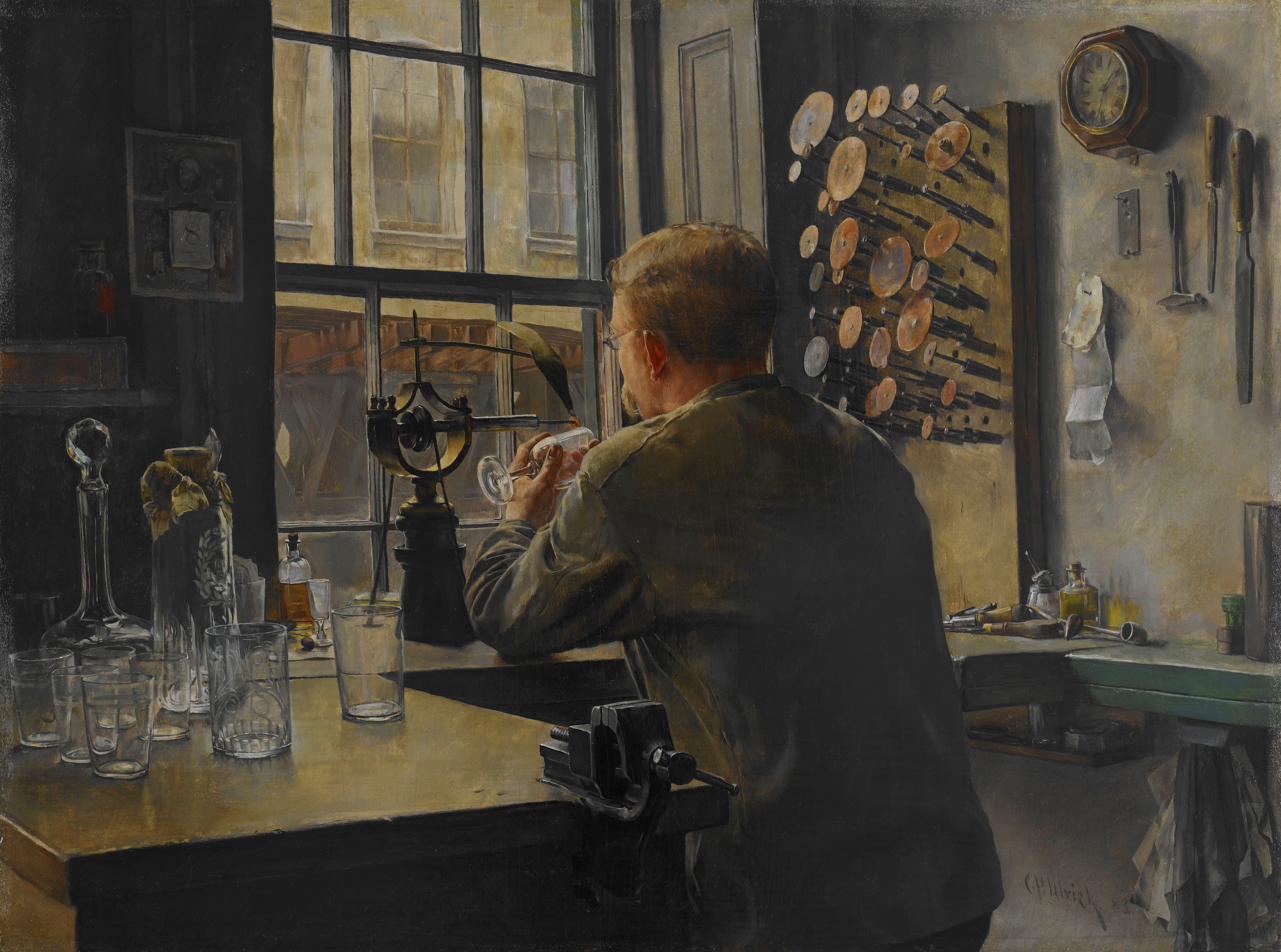
Charles Frederick Ulrich, The Glass Engraver, 1883. The board at right holds different grinding-wheels.

There are several different techniques of glass engraving. It has been practised since ancient times, including Roman glass, and professionally engraved glass has always been an expensive luxury, requiring lavish amounts of labour by a highly skilled craftsman or artist. In recent centuries the most notable periods and places of production started in the 16th century, initially mostly in Venetian glass, then later in Germany and Bohemian glass. From about 1645 it was used in the Netherlands, which was producing the finest engraving by 1700, by which time some engraving was used in most glass-making centres in Europe. The late 17th and early 18th centuries were in some ways the peak period of achievement and popularity. From 1730 onwards it received some competition from the new geometric cut glass style developed in England. These related techniques were often combined in a single piece, but the engraving tended to be relegated to less prominent positions.

In the 19th century cut glass continued to dominate, and new techniques of etched glass, cheaper than engraving, also took some of the role formerly occupied by engraving. By the later part of the century, a whole variety of techniques, many including coloured glass, had developed. Engraved glass retained some niches, and was sometimes used in art glass and later studio glass, but no longer had its former importance, although there has been a revival in Britain, with many public commissions for large window-size pieces.

Much glass remains in private collections, and many museums do not display much of their holdings, and often do not display them to the best advantage, which is usually against a dark background. Wineglasses were meant to be appreciated by holding in the hand, and when full any distracting engraving on the other side of the glass was not visible, or much less so.

== Techniques ==
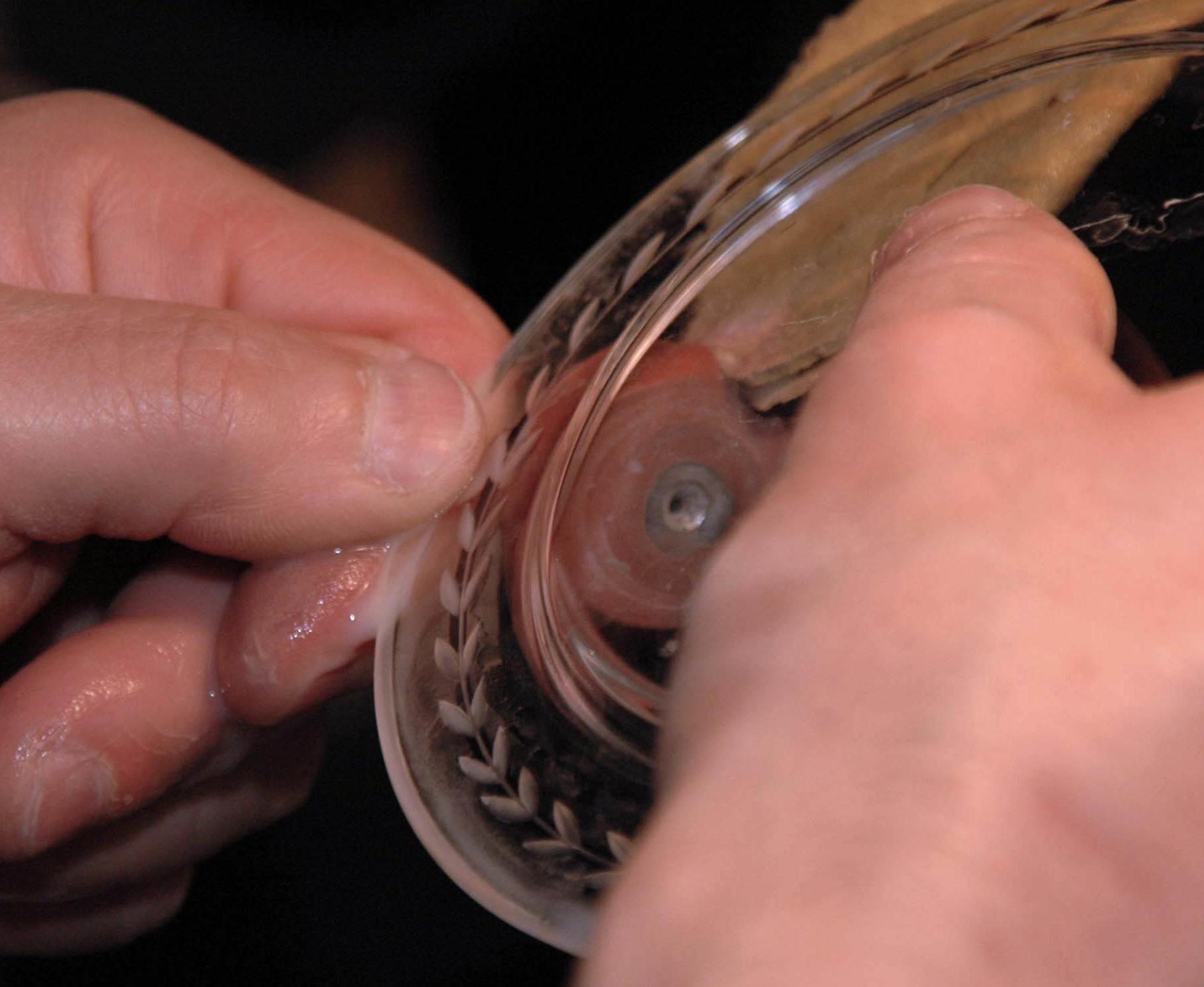
Engraving with an abrasive wheel (Italy)

Glass engraving has a variety of techniques. It is an intaglio form, with images and inscriptions cut into the surface of the glass through abrasion; but if the cutting is other than very shallow, it becomes glass cutting in the usual terminology. Tools for wheel-engraving glass are typically small abrasive wheels and drills (very similar to those for cut glass), with small lathes often used. Engraving wheels are traditionally made of copper, with a linseed oil and fine emery powder mixture used as an abrasive. Today stone wheels are often used. However, any sharp point that is hard enough to mark glass may be used, and in the past "diamond-point" engraving has often been used, especially for inscriptions of text. Today this is often called "point engraving", and the tip of the tool is more likely to be tungsten carbide than diamond. Such engraving might be added to a glass (or window) at any point after the glass was made, and consequently can be hard to date.

Another form of engraving is "stipple" in which the image is created by a large number of small dots or short lines on the surface of the glass with the use of small diamond-tipped tools. The scratches and small dots made in this method can, in the hands of a skilled artist, be used to produce images of astonishing clarity and detail. A mixture of diamond-point, wheel-engraving and stipple can all be used in the same piece, though most pieces use one of them for most or all of the work. Typically the design, or at least the main outlines, are marked on the glass before engraving begins.

Sandblasting is another technique used in glass engraving. Abrasive is sprayed through a sandblasting gun onto glass which is masked up by a piece of stencil in order to produce inscriptions or images. This is often used for engraving large areas such as windows, and the result is often similar to that achieved by glass etching using acid.

The engraver might be employed by the glassmaker, or completely independent, buying glass blanks or finished glasses and other pieces to work on. This seems to go as far back as Roman times. Modern laser engraving on glass is another technique, generally only used for decorative purposes mechanically, for example to reproduce images on mirrors.

Details showing the different techniques

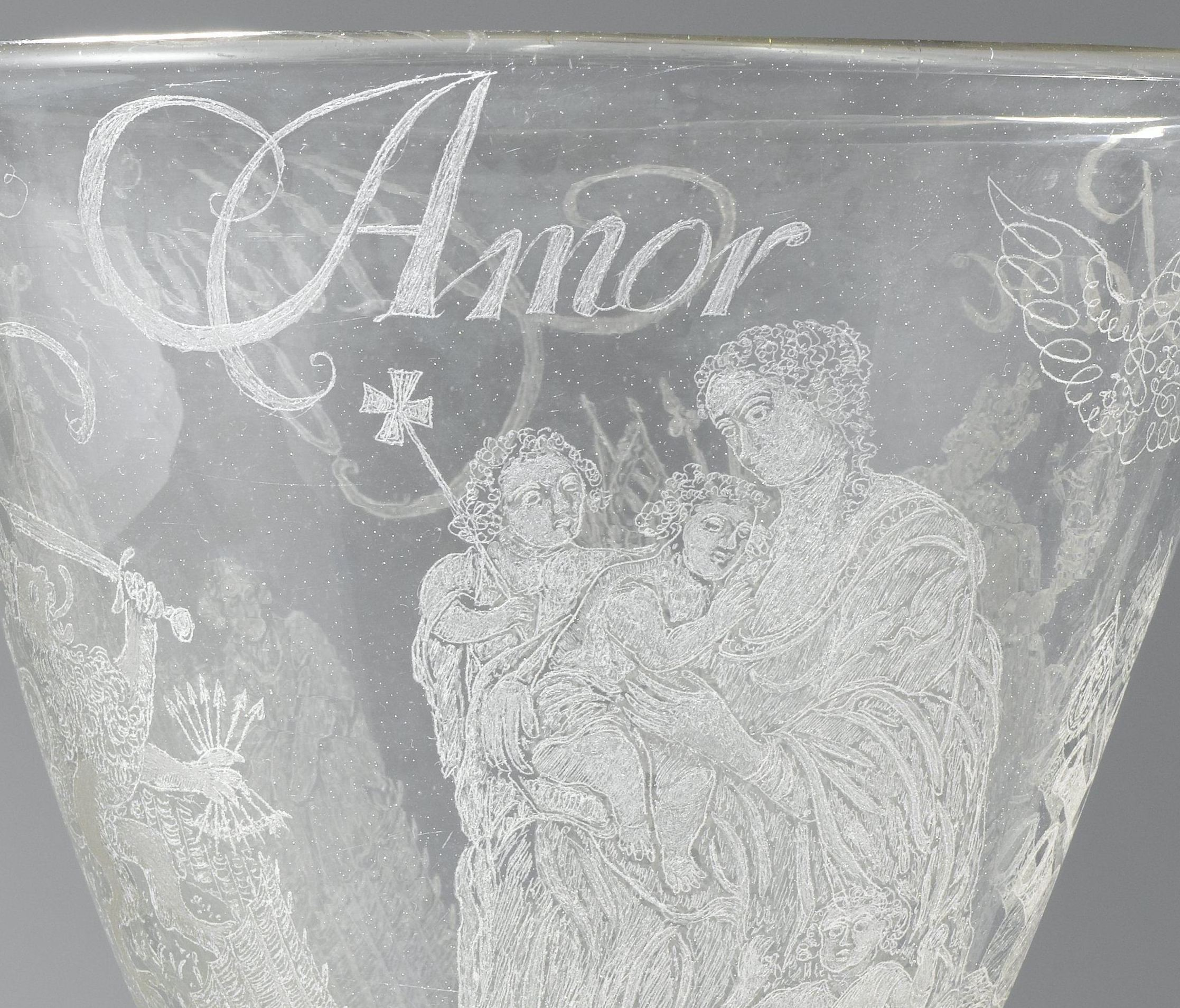
Dutch glass with diamond-point engraving, 1697

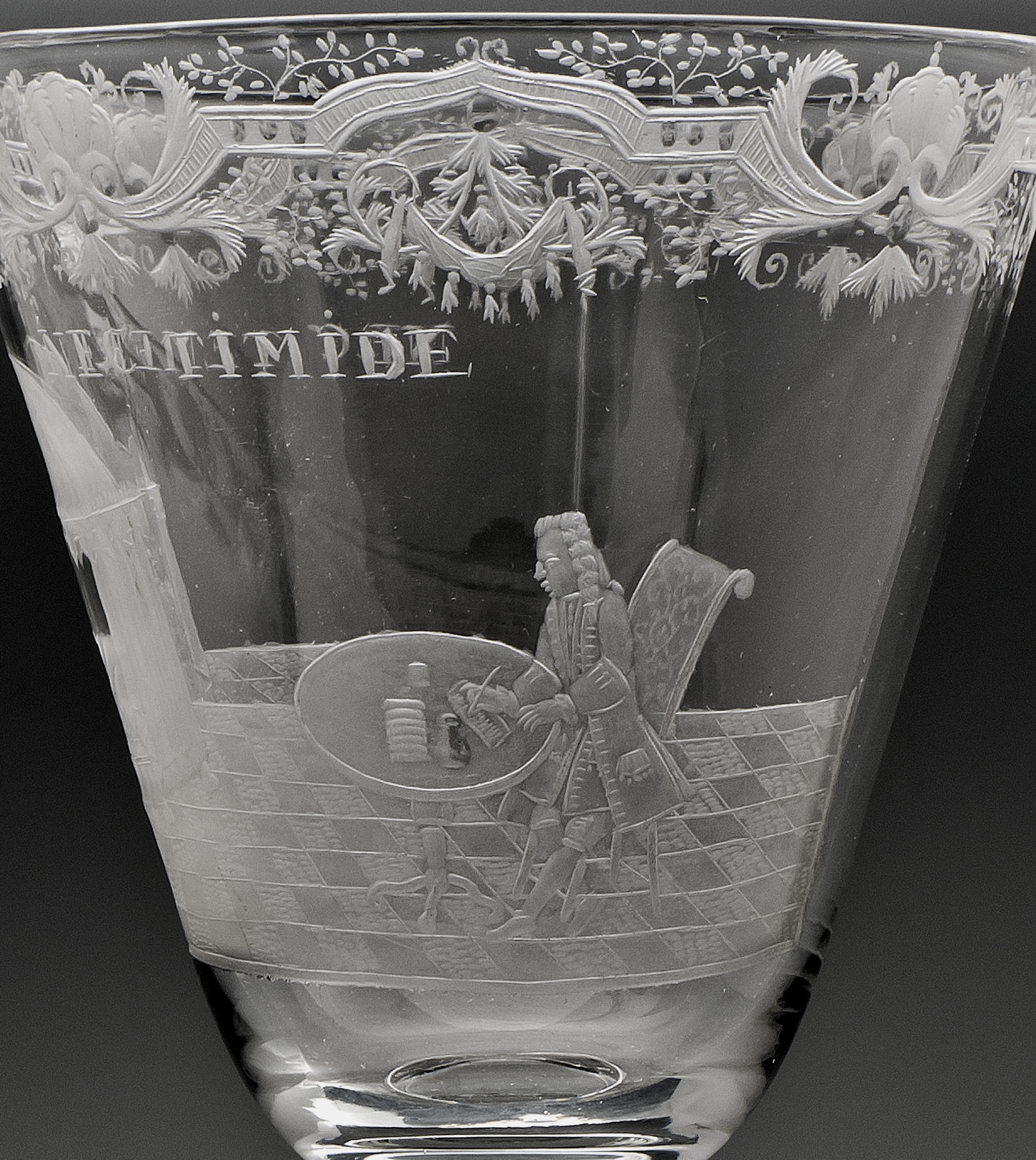
Wheel-engraved businessman, Dutch engraving on English glass, 1735–50

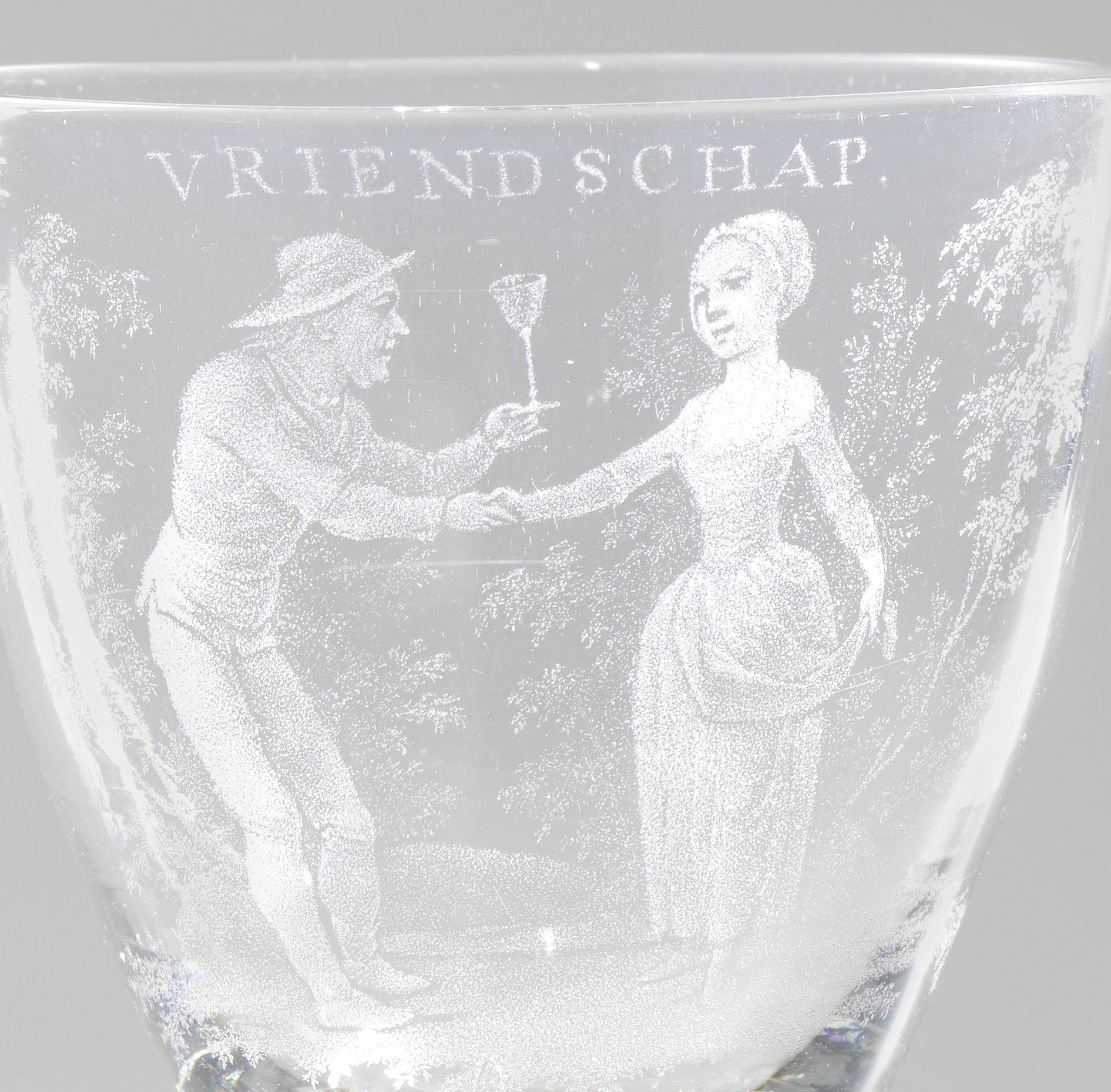
Stipple engraved Dutch glass inscribed "Friendship". Attributed to David Wolff, late 18th century

== History ==
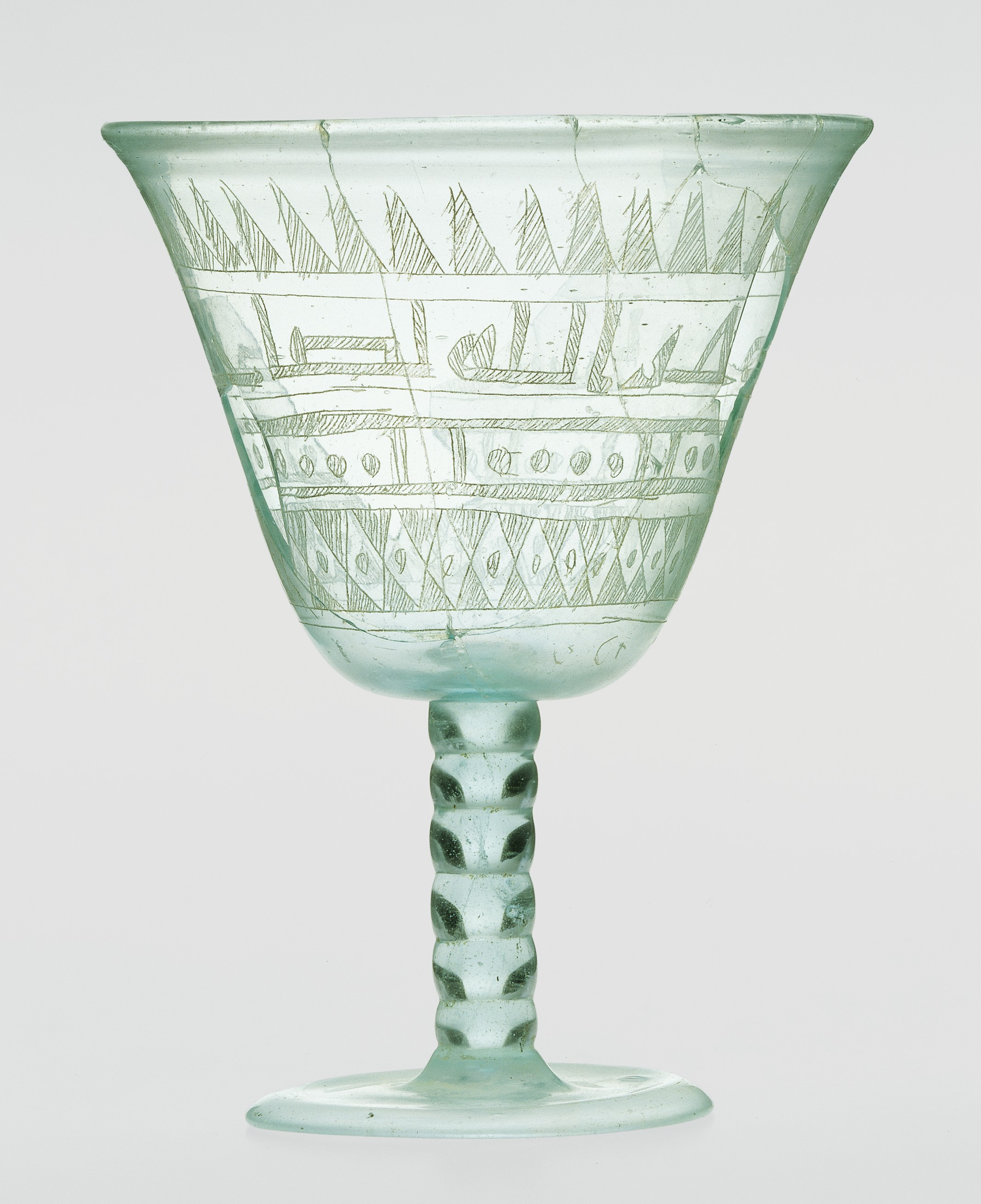
"Scratched" Islamic glass inscribed "Drink! Blessings from God to the owner of the goblet", Iraq or Syria, 8th or 9th century.

=== To the 16th century ===
Engraving on Roman glass was mostly of ornamental patterns, but some figurative images were made, apparently from the 2nd century AD onwards, more often on bowls or plates than cups. Some of these are rather complex. These included both pagan and Judeo-Christian religious subjects. Fragments have been found from Wales to Afghanistan.

There was some engraved early Islamic glass, but as with the Romans, deep cutting (often called carving) was rather more important. Medieval Venetian glass also used engraving for ornament, but it was generally subordinate to elaborate "hot work" effects, and work in enamelled glass. Most Venetian glass aimed at extreme thinness and delicacy, making it risky to attempt engraving, which was only done lightly with a diamond point. This taste continued through the Renaissance and wheel-engraving was in fact not used in Venice until the eighteenth century, much later than elsewhere.

=== Renaissance ===
Diamond-point engraved glass, probably mostly Venetian-made, though possibly engraved later and elsewhere, became gradually more common from about 1530. Some seems to have been made in Innsbruck, where Venetian glassmakers from Murano were allowed to work for a time under an agreement between the Venetian Republic and Archduke Ferdinand II. As was the case at least until the French Revolution, coats of arms were the centre of many decorative schemes, including several pieces with the arms of the Medici Pope Pius IV (r. 1559–65). The cargo of a ship wrecked off the coast of Croatia in 1583, on its way to Constantinople, included engraved and other types of glass, fragments of which have been recovered after the wreck was rediscovered in 1967.

From the 16th to the 18th century there was also a good deal of amateur engraving of glass, much of it just inscribing a name, but some with images. This period coincided with the development in gem-cutting of the modern facet-cut diamond, making the essential diamond-point tool readily to hand for many of the wealthy. Windows were also subject to this treatment. There is rarely any difficulty in distinguishing even the best amateur work from that by professional workshops.

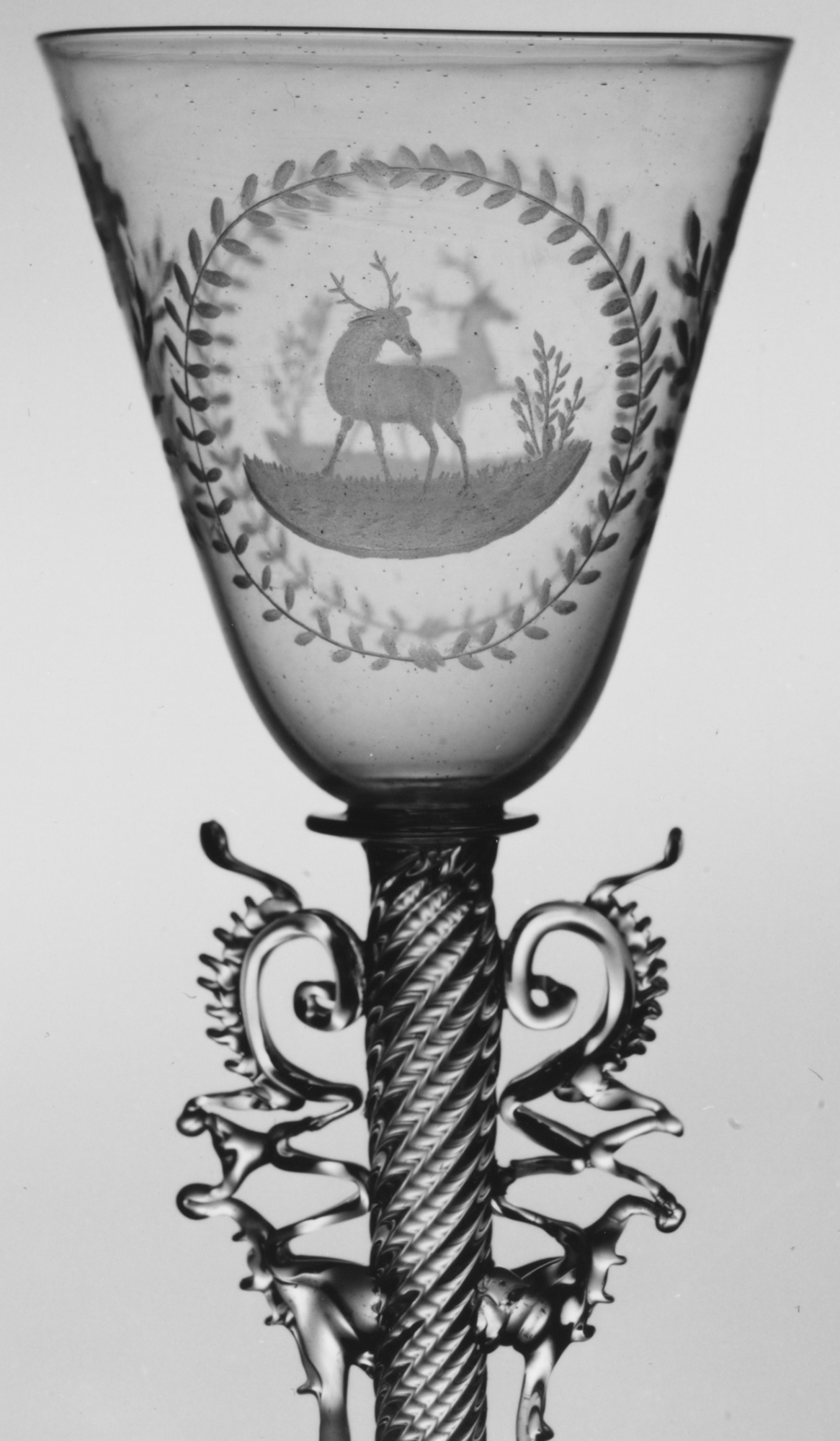
17th-century glass, probably Venice

By the later 16th century the efforts of the Venetian Republic to hold on to its virtual monopoly in the production of luxury glass, mainly by keeping skilled workers in the republic, were beginning to fail. Other countries, often led by their monarchs, were keen to have their own fine glass industries, and tempted skilled workers away. This led to a diffusion of the Venetian style to many centres around Europe. The glass made in this movement is called "façon de Venise" ("Venetian style"); the quality is typically rather lower than the Venetian originals, partly from difficulties sourcing the right materials, and the place of manufacture is often hard to discern. Engraved glass was a part of this diffusion, and initially was especially developed in Germany.

In England Jacob Verzelini, a Venetian glassmaker already working in London, was granted a monopoly for 21 years in 1574 over Venetian-style vessel glass. His workshop developed a style with a large amount of simple but attractive engraving, much of it floral, and with the shapes filled in with parallel lines throughout. The engraver seems to have been Anthony de Lysle, a Frenchman.

It was the Germans who first revived the wheel-engraving of glass; it had remained in use for hardstone carving and engraved gems, which are mostly harder than glass. Caspar Lehmann, a gem-cutter perhaps from Munich, is usually considered the first to engrave glass this way, after arriving in Prague in 1588. Prague had the court of Rudolf II, Holy Roman Emperor, a significant patron of Northern Mannerism in several of the arts. The Habsburg court moved to Vienna after Rudolf's death but the Bohemian glass industry continued to grow in strength, reaching a peak of importance in the 18th century.

=== 17th and 18th centuries ===
Glass engraving continued in Germany, and grew rapidly in Bohemia and Silesia, with outcrops in several other countries. By perhaps 1645 glass engraving spread from Germany to the Netherlands, a great centre of engraving for printmaking and enjoying the huge economic boom of the Dutch Golden Age. Dutch engraving had become the finest in Europe by the end of the century.

==== Germany and Central Europe ====
The 17th century saw great technical improvements in glass-making, some of which assisted engravers. In Bohemia chalk was added to the basic potash-lime glass, increasing its strength, workability and refractive index. Glassworks there were often started or promoted by the owners of great estates; the requirement for large amounts of wood for the kilns assisted the clearance of forests for agricultural land. The power to drive the grinding-wheels was typically produced by water mills beside the workshop.

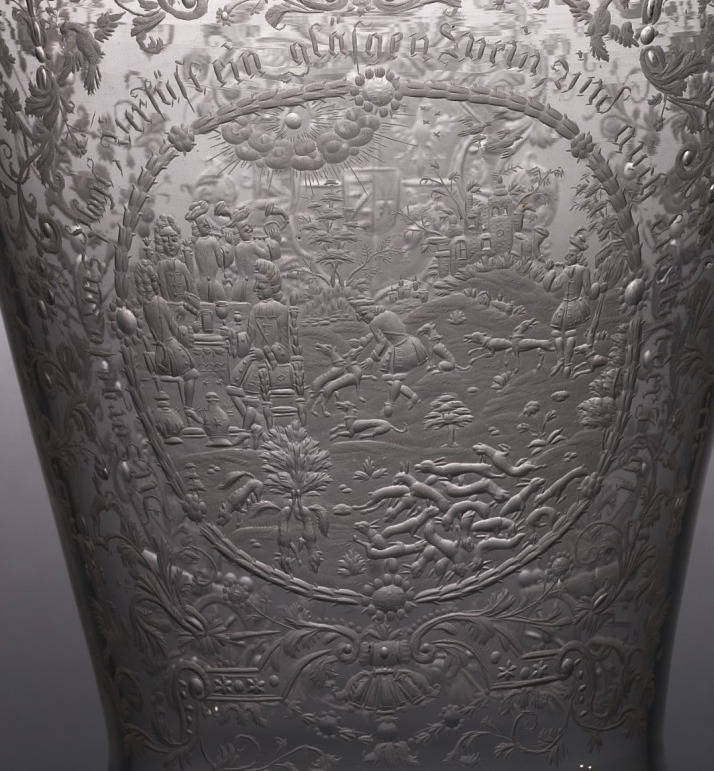
Hunting scene, Bohemian, c. 1710; coat of arms on the far side.

Caspar Lehmann's pupil Georg Schwanhardt moved from Prague to his native city of Nuremberg in 1622, and founded a workshop which lasted over a century, continued by his family and others. Unlike the Bohemian engravers, those in Nuremberg often signed their pieces. The most common shapes made were goblets with covers and beakers with "bun" feet. The engraved decoration, normally restricted to the bowl and top of the cover, included a wide range of subjects, drawing from, but not exactly copying, contemporary prints. Portraits of rulers, coats of arms, scenes from classical mythology and the Bible, emblems and allegories are all found, and "battle scenes in woodland settings" were a speciality.

Elsewhere in Germany, "patriotic decoration tended to be the norm", and glass engraving tended to be centred on the many princely courts, many of which had a Hofkrystalschneider or court glass engraver with his workshop working largely to service the court, including making glasses, often engraved with his portrait, for the prince to give as presents. The exact use of the typical covered cup (pokale) is not entirely certain; it is unclear how often they were made in sets, and whether they were used often, or reserved for very formal feasts and toasting.

In Bohemia and Silesia, which became a centre of glass engraving over the 17th century, engravers made more for general commercial sales. Increasing prosperity and expanded production was bringing engraved glass within the reach of a much wider public, and during the first half of the 18th century the Bohemian industry developed a large network of pedlars, including trainee engravers for part of the year, who sold engraved glass across Europe, the trainees able to offer added inscriptions in diamond point to customers. Through Spain, engraved glass could reach Mexico and the Black Sea.

The French style Régence, a lighter version of earlier French Baroque, reached Germany and Central Europe after 1710, mostly via ornament prints by French designers such as Jean Bérain the Elder and his son, and the German Paul Decker, working in a similar style. The German strapwork style known as Laub- und bandelwerk became common, as it did in porcelain from Meissen and Vienna from about the 1730s, but tended to become over-elaborate.

==== Netherlands ====
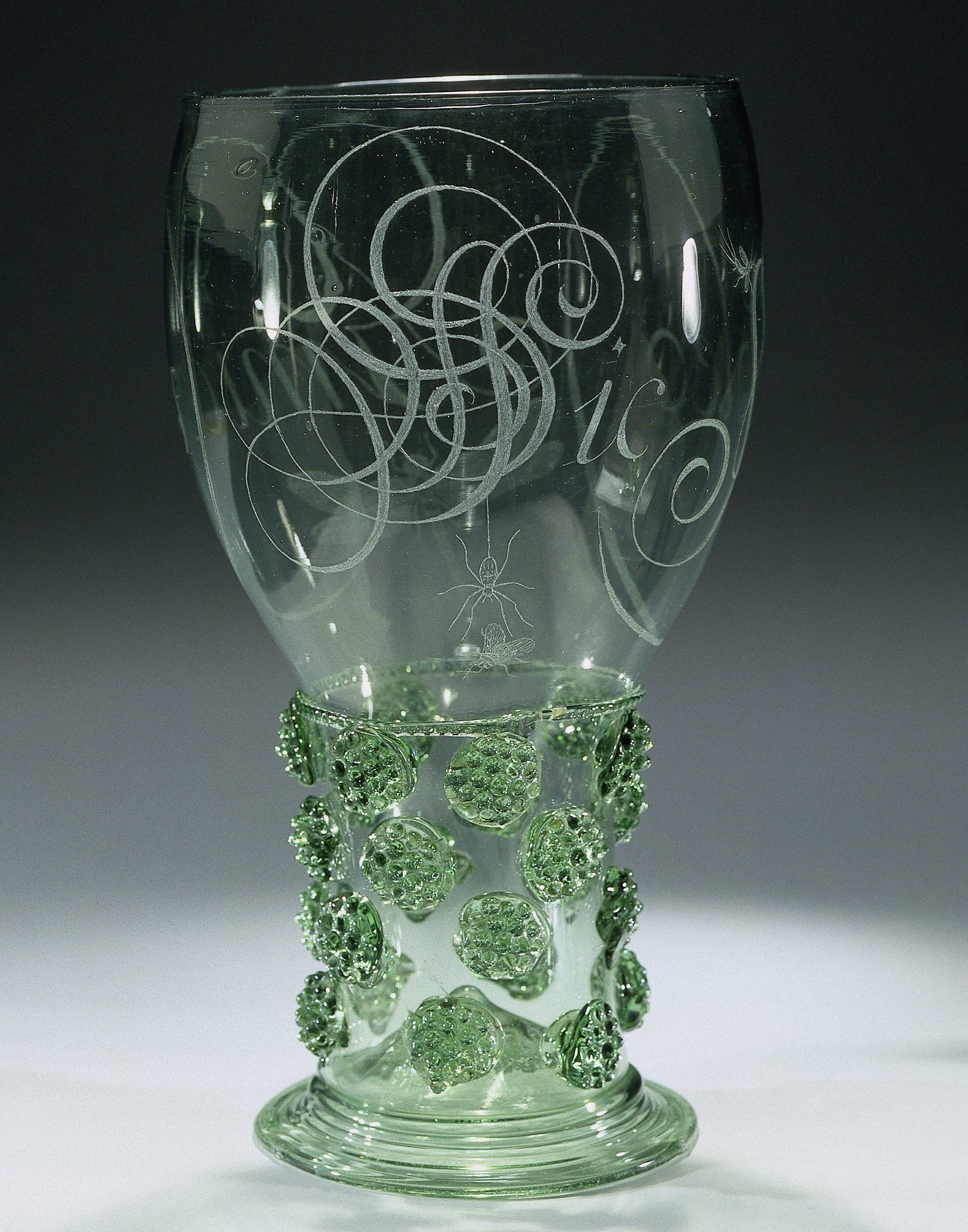
Roemer, engraving attributed to Maria Tesselschade Visscher

"Amateur" engraving in diamond point, sometimes a sideline for artists in printmaking, was especially strong in the Netherlands, some of it including fine calligraphy, and with women among the most celebrated artists. The well-off sisters Maria and Anna Visscher produced work of this type, while Anna Maria van Schurman was another Dutch female intellectual, who was also a trained painter. In the 18th century the tax collector Frans Greenwood was the first to use the stipple engraving technique to make virtually all of his images, which were mostly figure subjects drawn from prints. In 2002 a wineglass of 1742 signed by Greenwood sold for 44,650 euros at Christie's.

The German Jacob Sang, from a glass-making family of Weimar, was active in Amsterdam from 1752 to 1762. He was one of the most outstanding professionals, making extremely detailed wheel-engraved scenes. Like many Dutch engravers he preferred to use the slightly less brittle "English" type of lead glass developed by George Ravenscroft some decades before, though it now appears that this was by his time also being made on the continent, at Middelburg and elsewhere. By the end of the 18th century, as in some other centres, glass engraving had largely fallen from fashion.

Perhaps the greatest Dutch engraver, David Wolff (1732–1798), came at the end of the period, and worked entirely in stipple. His unusual technique involved tapping his tool with a small hammer to make each mark. His individual marks can usually only be seen under magnification, and his backgrounds are "rather dark and mysterious", so that it seems as if "his subjects have stepped forward into the light". Many works once given to him have now been reattributed to three unknown engravers, perhaps forming a workshop. One fine engraver in the stipple style is known only as "Alius", and another is Aert Schouman (1710–92), a pupil of Greenwood.

More than elsewhere in Europe, Dutch pieces tend to commemorate a specific occasion, mostly with wheel-engraving. A glass engraved in Utrecht to celebrate the birth of William V, Prince of Orange in 1748, showing an orange tree with a new shoot, uses an English wineglass made about 30 years earlier. As well as those subjects often found elsewhere, the Dutch often engraved ships, many pieces inscribed for toasting a specific vessel, new business partnerships, and a fairly standard scene of the "mothering chamber" (kraamkamer) with a mother in her curtained bed, with or without a newborn child, and an inscription, usually directed firstly at the mother, around the rim above.

Dutch subject matter on wineglasses

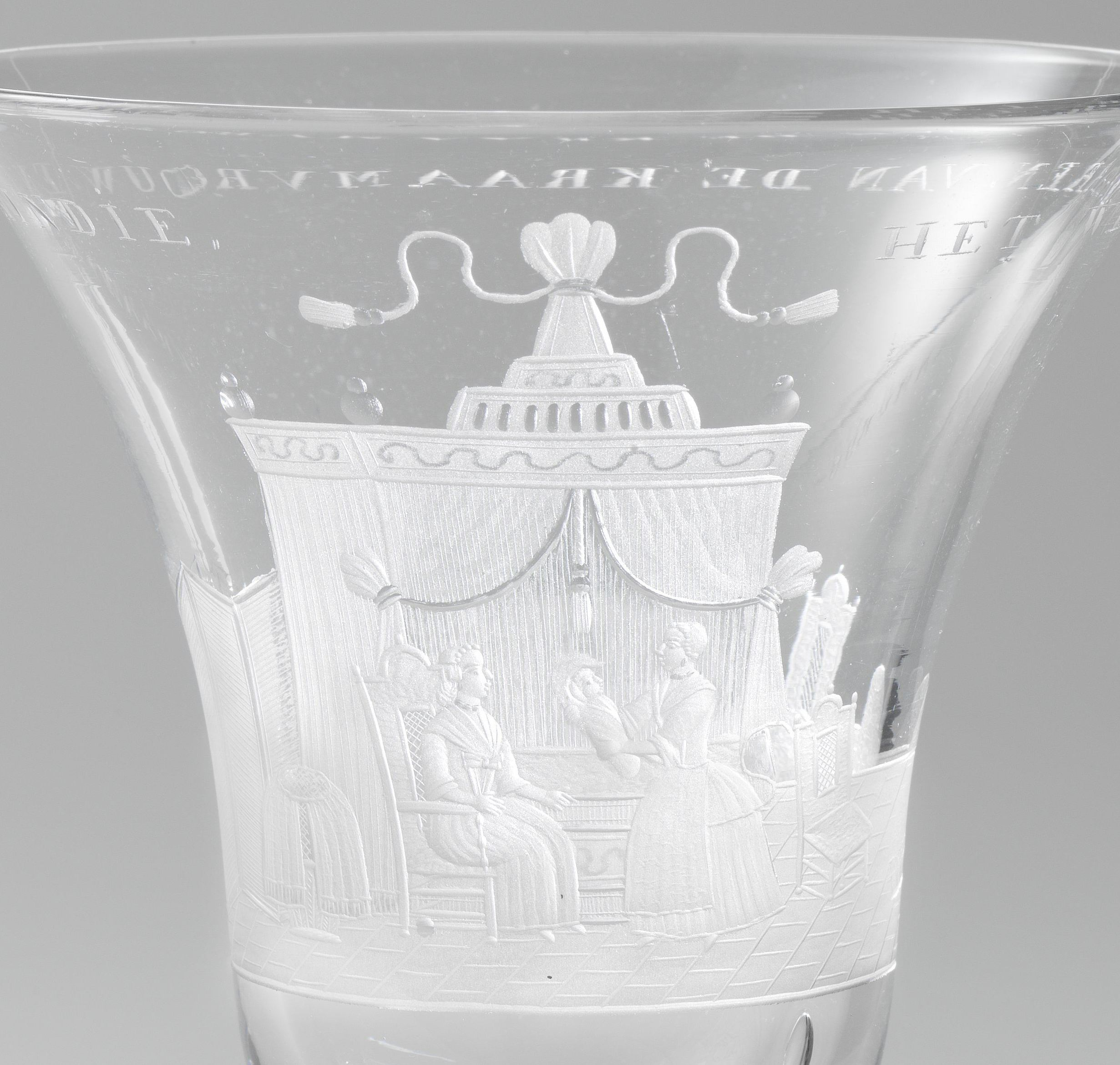
Kraamkamer scene inscribed "Best wishes to the mother-to-be and baby", wheel-engraved, 1725-1750.

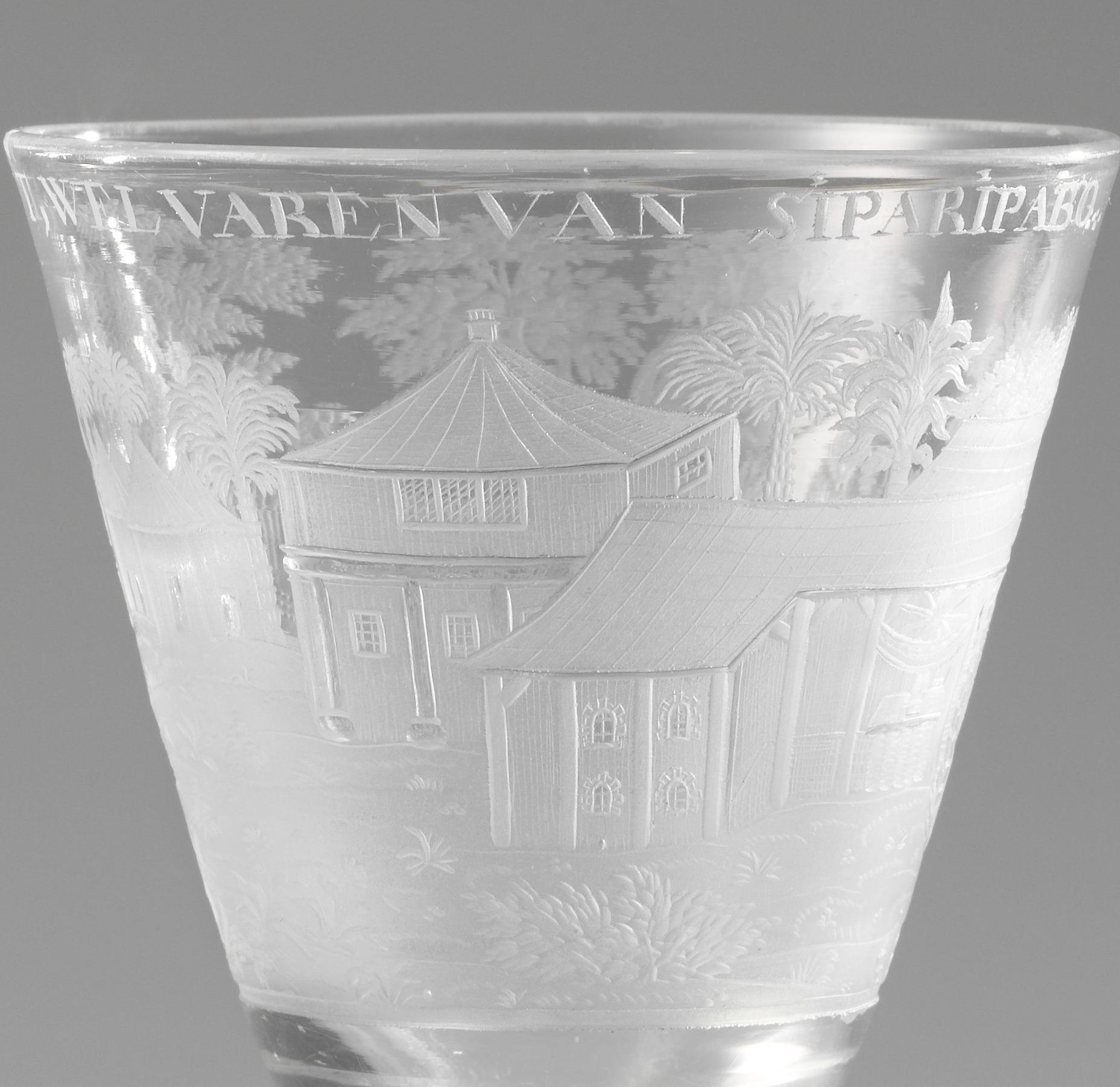
"Best wishes for Siparipabo", a colonial plantation in Dutch Surinam, wheel-engraved, 1725-1750.

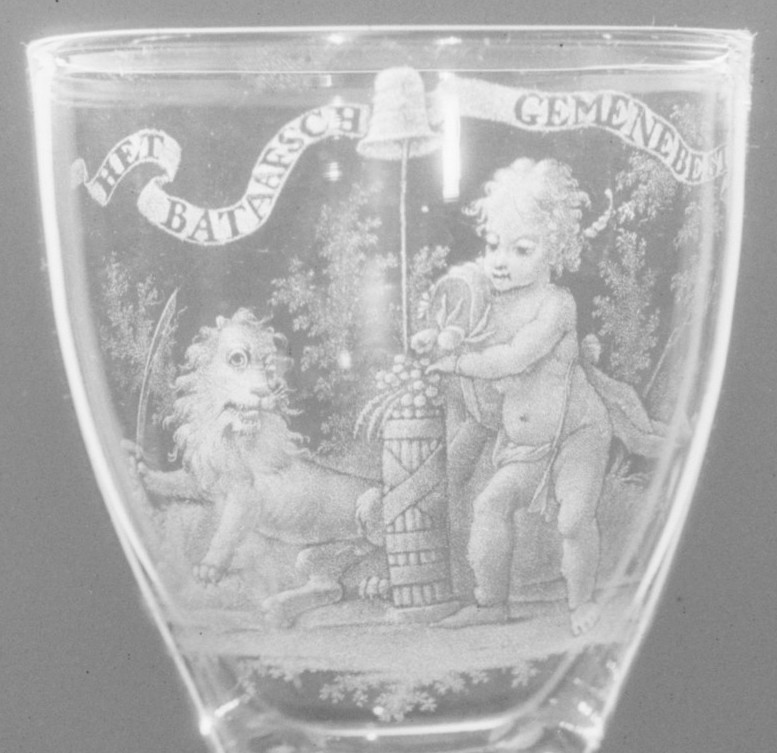
Patriotic scene with the Batavian Lion, Cap of Liberty, and putto with a cornucopia, inscribed "The Batavian Commonwealth", c. 1765, stipple engraving by David Wolff.

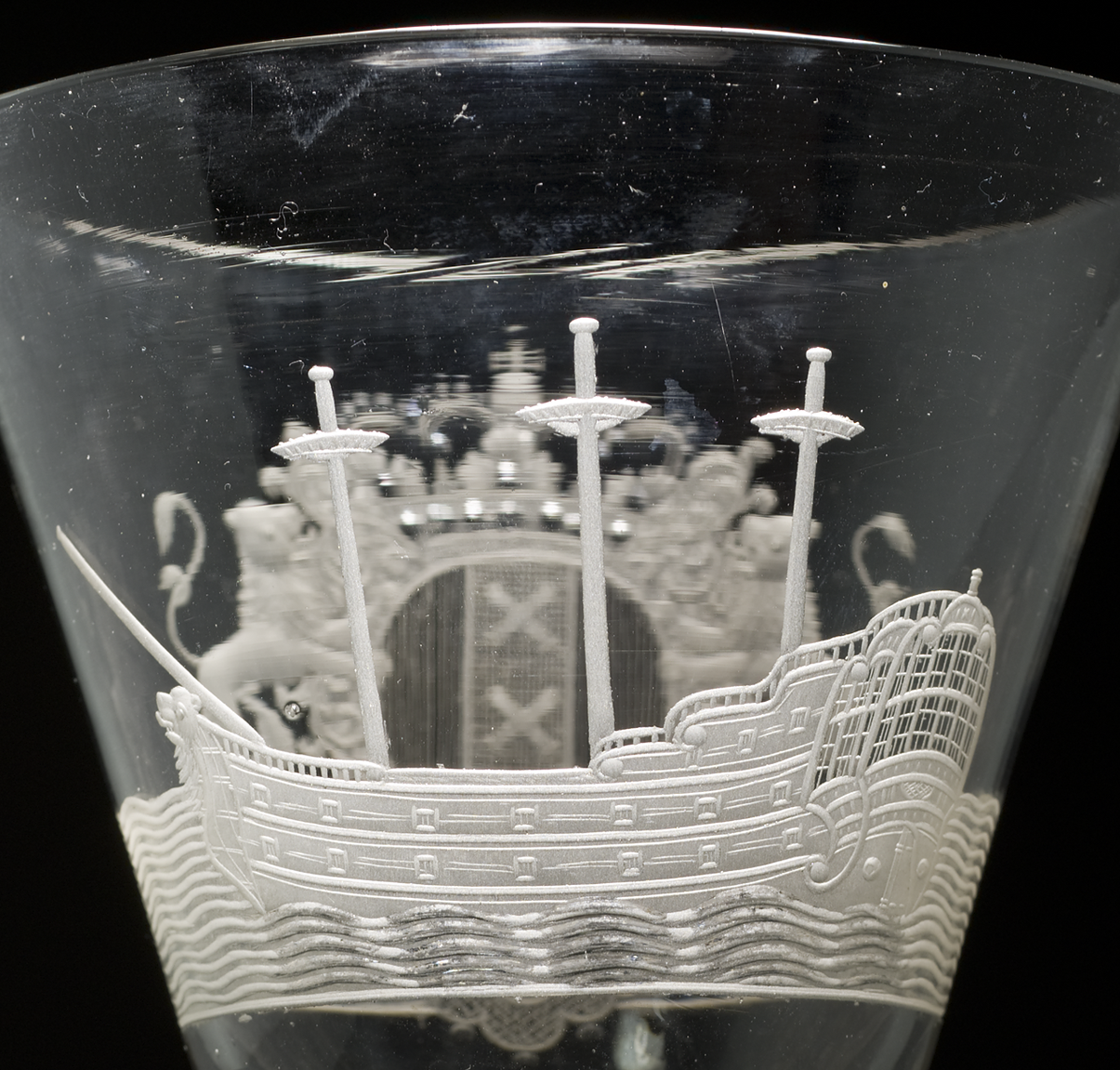
Ship portrait, wheel-engraved, with coat of arms on the other side, 1750–1770, perhaps on English glass

==== England ====
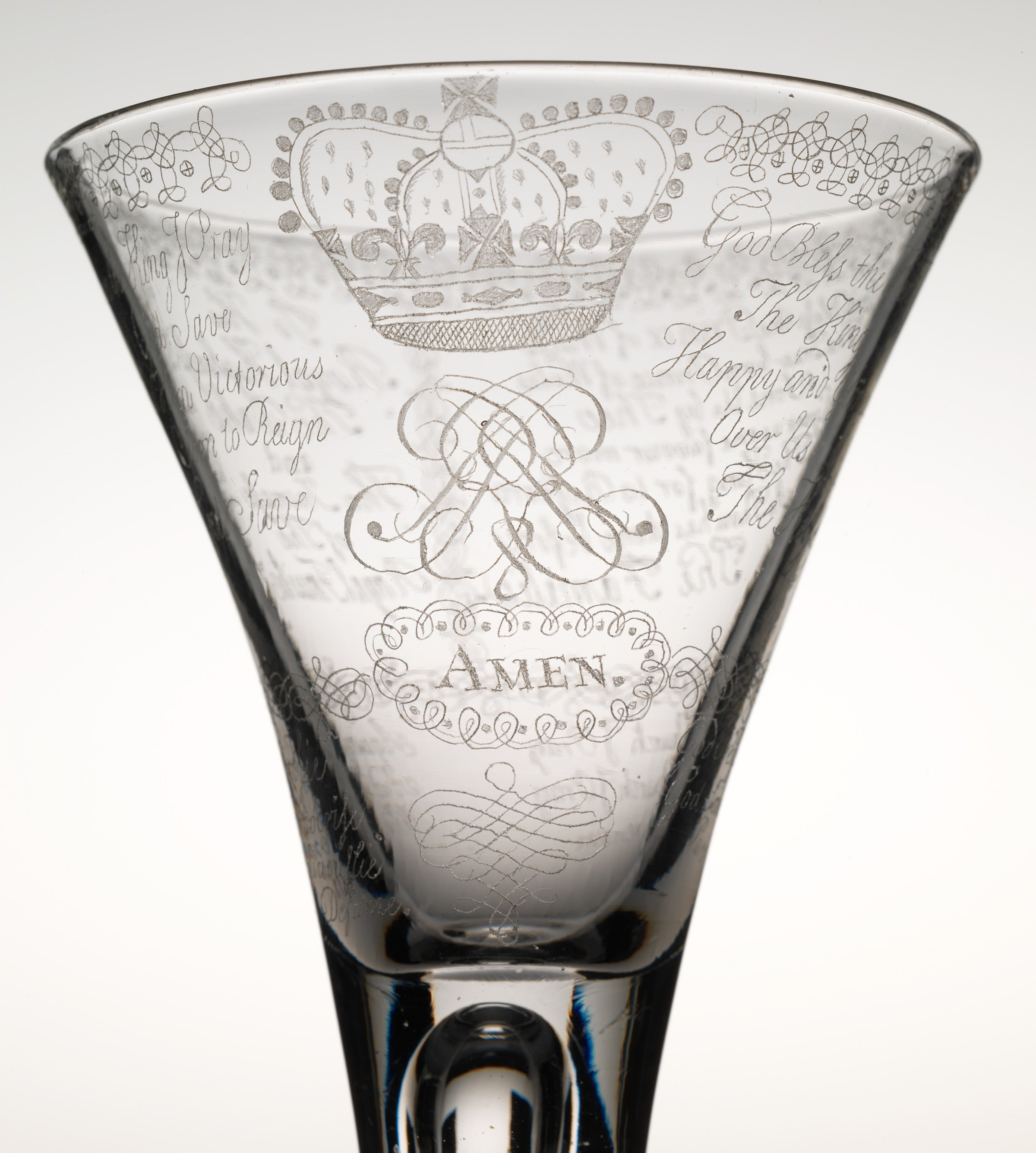
Jacobite "Amen" glass, British, 1720–1749. See text for inscription.

English engraving scaled no artistic heights, and the greatest English contribution to glass engraving was Ravenscroft's improved type of lead glass, which was exported and then imitated in at least northern Europe. Initially much of the better engraving was done on English glass sent to the Netherlands to be engraved, or by foreign engravers in England. The finer sorts of English glasses, until the cut glass style arrived in the 1730s, relied heavily for decoration on spirals ("twists") of air held inside the stem. The English invention of the much more deeply cut cut glass style often included engraved ornament, mostly geometrical or floral, in a secondary role, especially near the rim. Later, a band of floral decoration high on the bowl was the most common engraving.

On earlier glass there were many simple inscriptions, some political, as in "Jacobite glass" inscribed with toasts to the exiled House of Stuart, or Jacobite emblems, some rather covert. Some surviving examples, especially of the so-called "Amen" type, are probably 19th-century engraving added to 18th-century glasses. The "Amen" glasses have long and fairly standard inscriptions, ending in "Amen", with a crown, English rose, or simple royal monogram or coat of arms. One example reads (in part):

Grant us one favour more
The King for to Restore
As Thou has done before
The Familie.

God Bless The Church I Pray
God Save The Church I pray
Pure to Remain
Against all Heresie
And Whigs Hypocrisie
Who Strive Maliciouslie
Her to Defame.

God Bless The Subjects all,
And save both great and small,
In every Station:
That will bring home The King
Who has best Right to Reign
It is the only Thing
Can Save The Nation

The Bohemian engraver and forger Franz Tieze (died 1932), working in Ireland, specialized in the other side of the political divide, prolifically adding Williamite engraving to old glass. It was later realized that a very high proportion of Williamite engraving was forged.

The Beilby family workshop, active in Newcastle on Tyne between 1757 and 1778 are famous for their enamelled glass, much of it using only white, so achieving a similar effect to engraving. They have usually been credited with the tall and elegant "Newcastle" glass shape, although in fact many of these were probably made in the Low Countries.

=== 19th century ===
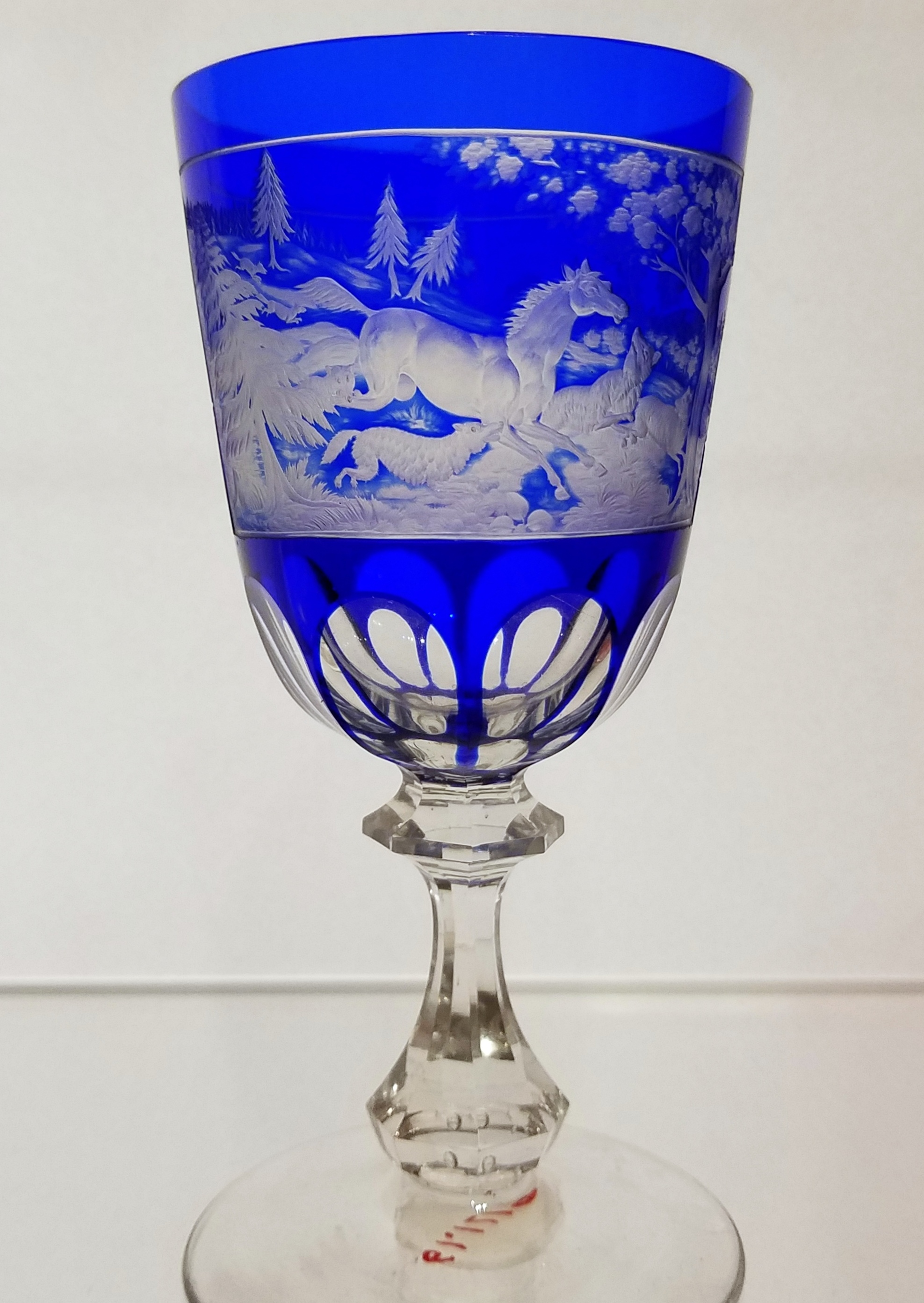
Goblet with wolves attacking a horse, New England Glass Company, c. 1860–1875, blown, cobalt-blue cased glass, cut and engraved by Louis F. Vaupel.

Glass-engraved figurative images as the primary decorative element on a particular object was less common in much of the Western world than before, with Bohemia the main exception. However, enough engraving was used as a secondary technique to keep a large number of trained engravers busy. Apart from light ornament, portraits and landscapes, often hunting scenes were the most popular subjects, and by 1850 "most engravers ... seem to have become stuck in an endless groove of producing stags in landscapes and the like". As the American glass industry developed rapidly in the second half of the century, engraving played its part, initially led by imported experienced engravers.

In the later part of the century various trends enlivened the decoration of glass, some making use of engraving. Victorian cameo glass used acid etching to create two colours on cased glass or flash glass, but there was some use of engraving for similar effects, especially in Bohemia and America. The development of Art Nouveau glass, art glass and that of the Arts and Crafts Movement, with a great emphasis on sculptural form and bright colour, had little place for engraving.

=== 20th century ===
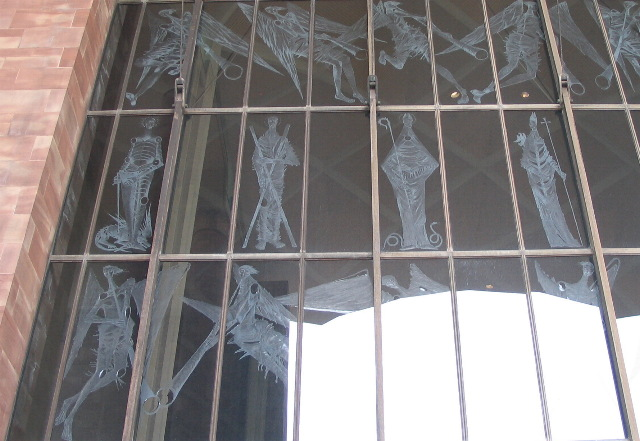
Great West Screen of Coventry Cathedral, engraved by John Hutton, 1962

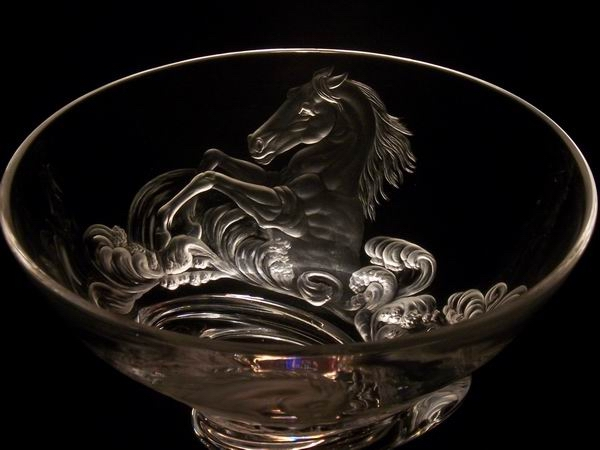
"White Horses", a wheel-engraved goblet by Edmond Suciu. American, Steuben Glass

Somewhat unexpectedly, there was a revival of glass engraving in Britain from the mid-1930s. Initially much of it focused on landscape subjects, in a pastoral and slightly Romantic mood whose influences included the painter and printmaker Samuel Palmer (1805–1881), whose early work was being rediscovered. Many used the stipple technique, including the leading figure Laurence Whistler (1912–2000). Whistler, along with David Peace and William Wilson are accredited as simultaneously reviving the craft of glass engraving during the 1930s.

Whistler had first engraved on glass in 1934, in true 17th-century-style engraving a sonnet and floral decoration on a window of a house he was staying at. The innovative style he later developed involved engraving both the inner and outer sides of the glass, giving a sense of depth. From 1955 to the 1980s he made an untypically large set of windows for St Nicholas' Church, Moreton, in Dorset.

In America, the Steuben Glass Works continued to produce engraved glass, both wheel-engraved and diamond point; this proved to be very compatible with Art Deco style in particular.

Especially after World War II in Britain, there were also a number of larger architectural engravings, often featuring figures nearly as large as life-size, executed on windows or glass screens. These included work by John Hutton (1906–1978) for the new Coventry Cathedral (completed 1962). Hutton's other commissions for monumental glass included work at Guildford Cathedral, the national Library and Archives Canada, and many other sites around Britain and the world. A set of figures of the population of Roman London, completed in 1960 for a now-demolished office block, were relocated to Bank Underground station. He developed a new technique for large pieces, using an angle grinder.

Anne Dybka (1922–2007), born and trained in England, emigrated to Australia in 1956, and pursued a career there. Alison Kinnaird (b. 1949) has always been based in Scotland, while Josephine Harris (1931–2020) worked in London.

=== 21st century ===
There are still many glass engravers who are producing bold, dynamic and aesthetically challenging artworks, but glass engravers feel somewhat pushed aside by the studio glass movement of recent years, and anxiety about the future of their technique is openly expressed. James Denison-Pender, mostly a stipple engraver, mentioned in an interview that traditional goblets are now very difficult to sell, while the market favours works on flat glass.

The UK Guild of Glass Engravers was founded in 1975, based in London and lists a number of glass artists as members, including Ronald Pennell. It has an online gallery of members' works with contact details for commissions and classes for people who want to learn about this art. A general exhibition is held every two years, with the most recent ones at the Fitzwilliam Museum in Cambridge.

== See also ==
- Bubblegram
- Pepita glass engraving from Mexico
