= Glass blank =

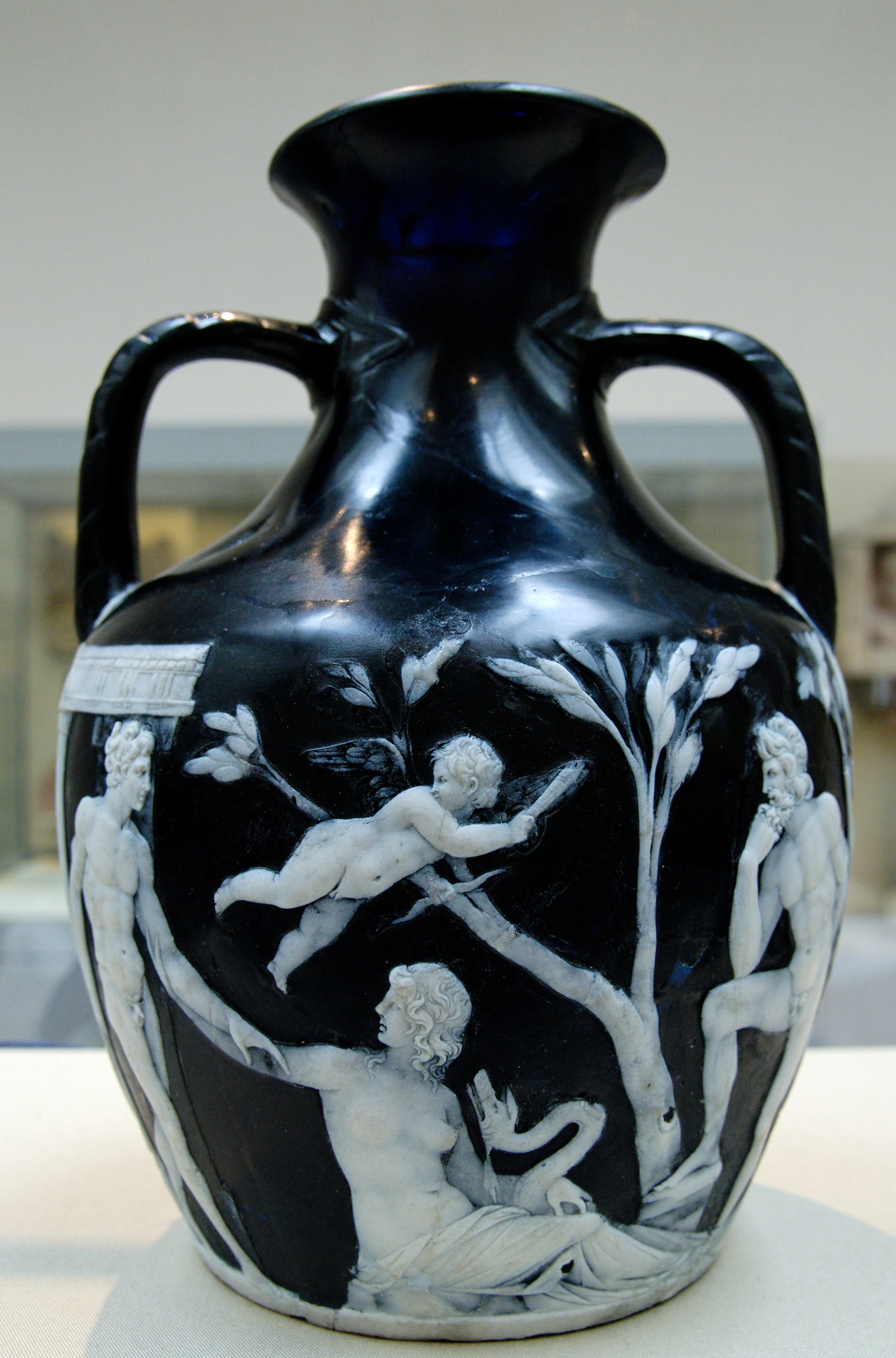
The Portland Vase at The British Museum is an example of a piece of glass created using a cased glass blank.

A glass blank is a piece of glass that requires additional decoration before it is considered finished. Types of decoration include cutting, engraving, acid-etching, gilding, and enameling. Often the term blank is used in reference to an uncut piece of glass that will be cut or engraved. "Blank" is used in the same way of pottery, especially porcelain, that was often decorated elsewhere, for example by hausmalers.

== Production ==
The glassmaking process can be divided into several stages, including: melting ingredients to make raw glass, remelting raw glass to make objects (sometimes adding decorations while the glass is still hot), and adding decorations to cooled glass objects. The last stage is often where blanks are involved. These are pieces of glass made with the intention of adding decoration to the cooled piece. Blanks are sometimes made in the same factory or studio in which they are decorated, but blanks can also be made and sold by one company to another company that adds decoration.

In glass engraving plain wineglasses that were many years old are often used. A glass engraved in Utrecht to celebrate the birth of William V, Prince of Orange in 1748, showing an orange tree with a new shoot, uses an English wineglass made about 30 years earlier.

== Types of blanks ==
Cased glass blanks and figured blanks are two types of blanks made with specific finishing decorations in mind. A cased glass blank is an object made with several layers of colors. When it is decorated (often by cutting or engraving) the lower layers of one or more different colors are revealed. A popular example of pieces made using cased glass blanks are cameo glass objects.

Figured blanks are made when hot glass is blown into a mold. While the molded shape is considered part of the decoration, additional details are often added after the glass is cooled.
