= Pepita (disambiguation) =

Pepita, or pumpkin seed, is the edible seed of pumpkins or related squashes.

Pepita may also refer to:

- Pepita glass engraving
- The Pepita, later the Maria Asumpta, a brig that sailed from 1858 to 1995

In people

- Mulher Pepita (born 1983), Brazilian singer
- Pepita de Oliva (1830–1871), Spanish dancer
- Pepita Pardell (1928-2019), Spanish animator, cartoonist, illustrator, painter

== See also ==
- Pepito (disambiguation)
