= Xia Gengqi =

Chinese curator

Xia Gengqi (夏更起) was born in Aug 1933 in Hebei Province, China and is a curator in Beijing Palace Museum. From 1950 to 1971, he engaged in administrative work in the Chinese Writers Association. In 1972, he was transferred to the Beijing Palace Museum and custody of the department engaged in Chinese lacquer, enamel art on glass, silver items, and other types of heritage management and research until now.

Xia Gengqi is one of the leading experts in Chinese lacquer, enamel art on glass, snuff bottles, Peking Glass, and cloisonné, and he and his expertise are used by those seeking confirmation of authenticity.

== Selected publications ==
- Masterpieces of Snuff Bottles in the Palace Museum, By : Xia Gengqi, Zhang Rong, Chen Runmin, Luo Yang(Beijing, 1995) Chinese+English Text
- Zhu Peichu and Xia Gengqi 朱培初、夏更起. 1988. 《鼻煙壺史話》. 北京﹕紫禁城出版社.
- Xia Gengqi 夏更起. 1995.《故宮博物院鼻煙壺選粹》. 北京：故宮博物院.
- Xia Gengqi (2005) Enameled Snuff Bottles Produced at the Palace Workshops, The Winter edition of the Journal of The International Chinese Snuff Bottle Society
- Xia Gengqi⮞㦃怆. Yuan Ming qi qi⏒㢝䆕⣷Lacquer wares of the Yuan and Ming dynasties. Shanghai : Shanghai ke xue ji shu chu ban she; Hong Kong : Shang wu yin shu guan (Hong Kong) you xian gong si, 2006.
