= Sangi =

Sangi may refer to:

- Sangi (surname)
- Sangi Railway, a Japanese railway company
- Sangee (2003 film), a 2003 Indian Bengali-language film
- Sangee (2025 film), a 2025 Indian Hindi-language film
- Sangi (Japan), the Japanese Imperial Council
- a spelling variant of Sangir (disambiguation)

== See also ==
- Sang (disambiguation)
- Sanghi, derogatory term for a member of the Rashtriya Swayamsevak Sangh, a Hindu nationalist organization in India
