= Cameo glass =

Form of glass art

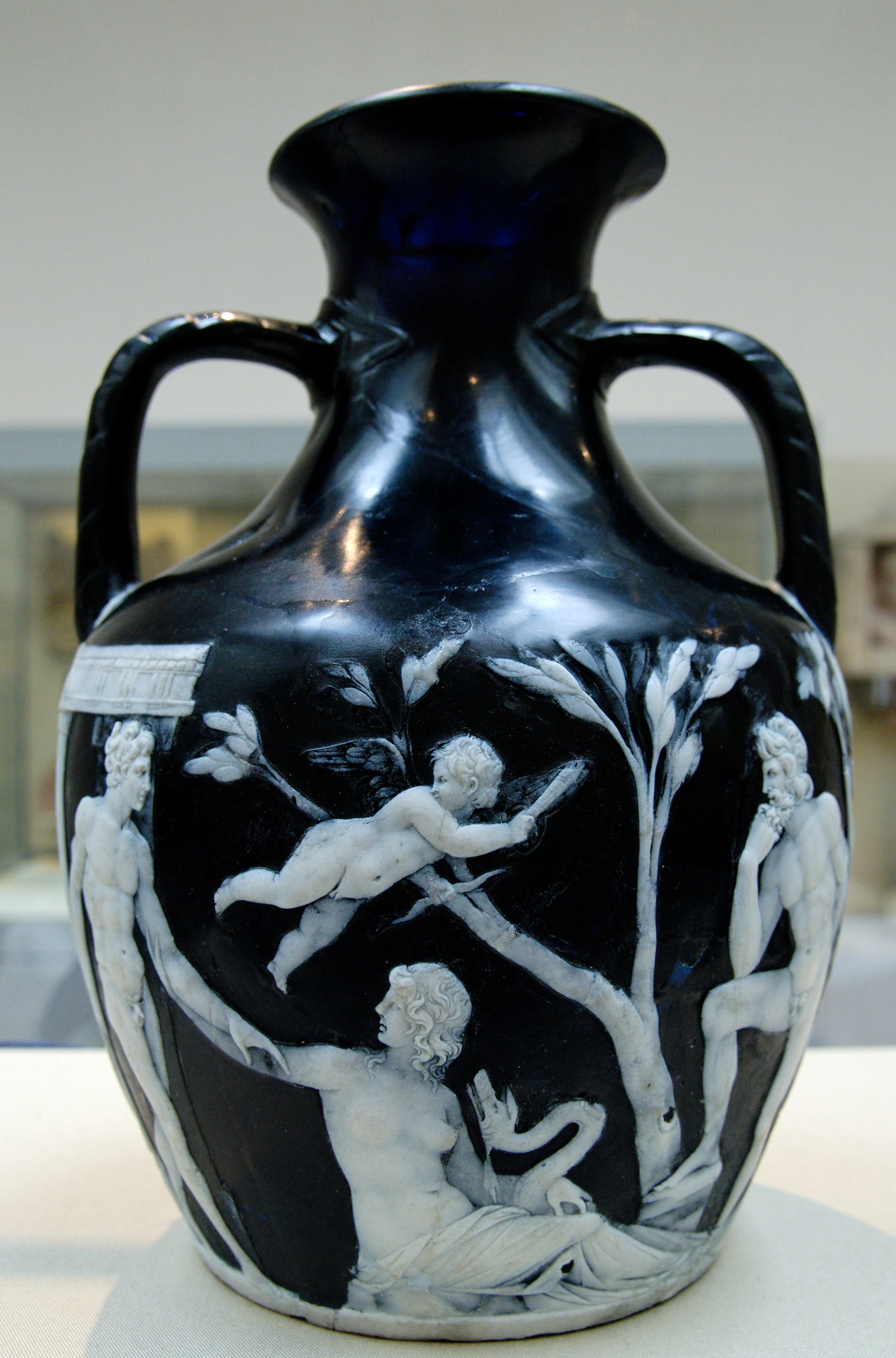
The Portland Vase, about 5–25 AD

Cameo glass is a luxury form of glass art produced by cameo glass engraving or etching and carving through fused layers of differently colored glass to produce designs, usually with white opaque glass figures and motifs on a dark-colored background. The technique is first seen in ancient Roman art of about 30 BC, where it was an alternative to the more luxurious engraved gem vessels in cameo style that used naturally layered semi-precious gemstones such as onyx and agate. Glass allowed consistent and predictable colored layers, even for round objects.

From the mid-19th century there was a revival of cameo glass, suited equally to Neo-Grec taste and the French Art Nouveau practiced by Émile Gallé. Cameo glass is still produced today.

== Roman glass ==
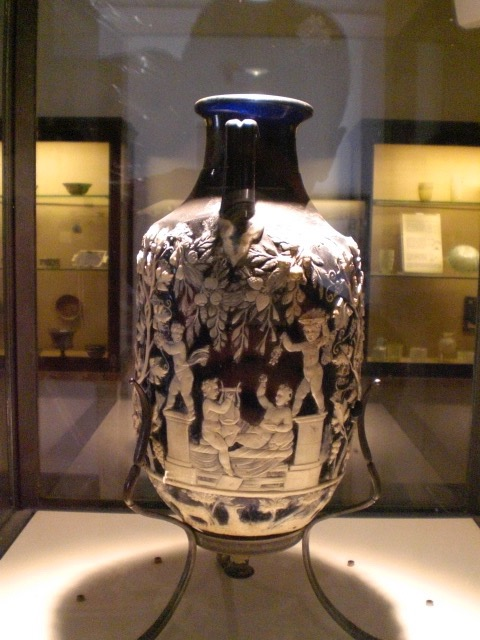
First-century Roman vase excavated from Pompeii

Roman cameo glass is fragile, and thus extremely rare—much more so than natural gemstone cameos such as the Gemma Augustea and Gonzaga Cameo, which are among the largest examples of many hundreds (at least) of surviving classical cameos produced from the 3rd century BC onward. Only about 200 fragments and 15 complete objects of early Roman cameo glass survive. The most famous example of these, and also among the best preserved, is the Portland Vase in the British Museum. Other fine examples, such as the Morgan Cup (Corning Museum of Glass), are drinking cups. Both of these named pieces show complex multi-figured mythological scenes, whose iconography has been much debated. The Getty Villa has another cup, and a perfume bottle with scenes of Egyptian deities. The Metropolitan Museum of Art in New York has a fragment over 11 inches (28 cm) long and 5 inches (13 cm) high from what was evidently an architectural revetment showing an acanthus frieze with eagles, the luxurious equivalent in glass of a "Campana relief" in pottery.

Judging from the very limited number of survivals, cameo glass was apparently produced in two periods: the early period about 30 BC to 60 AD, and then for about a century from the late-3rd century to the period of Constantine the Great and his sons. The latter period also saw a brief court revival of the art of gem-carving, which had been in decline. All these dates are somewhat tentative, and it is possible that smaller gem-like pieces of cameo glass continued to be produced between these periods.

Glass from the later period is even rarer than from the earlier, with only a "handful" of complete pieces known, one of which was excavated in Norway. Its use was clearly restricted to the elite; the Portland Vase is said to have been excavated from the tomb of the Emperor Septimius Severus, for whom it would have been a 200-year-old antique. The most popular color scheme for objects from the early period is white over blue, as in the vase from Pompeii (illustration), but other colors are found, such as the white over black, imitating onyx, of the Portland Vase. In the early period usually all layers are opaque. By contrast, in the later period, there is a translucent colored overlay over a virtually colorless background, perhaps imitating rock crystal. The surface of the top layer elements is flat rather than carved as in the earlier group of pieces.

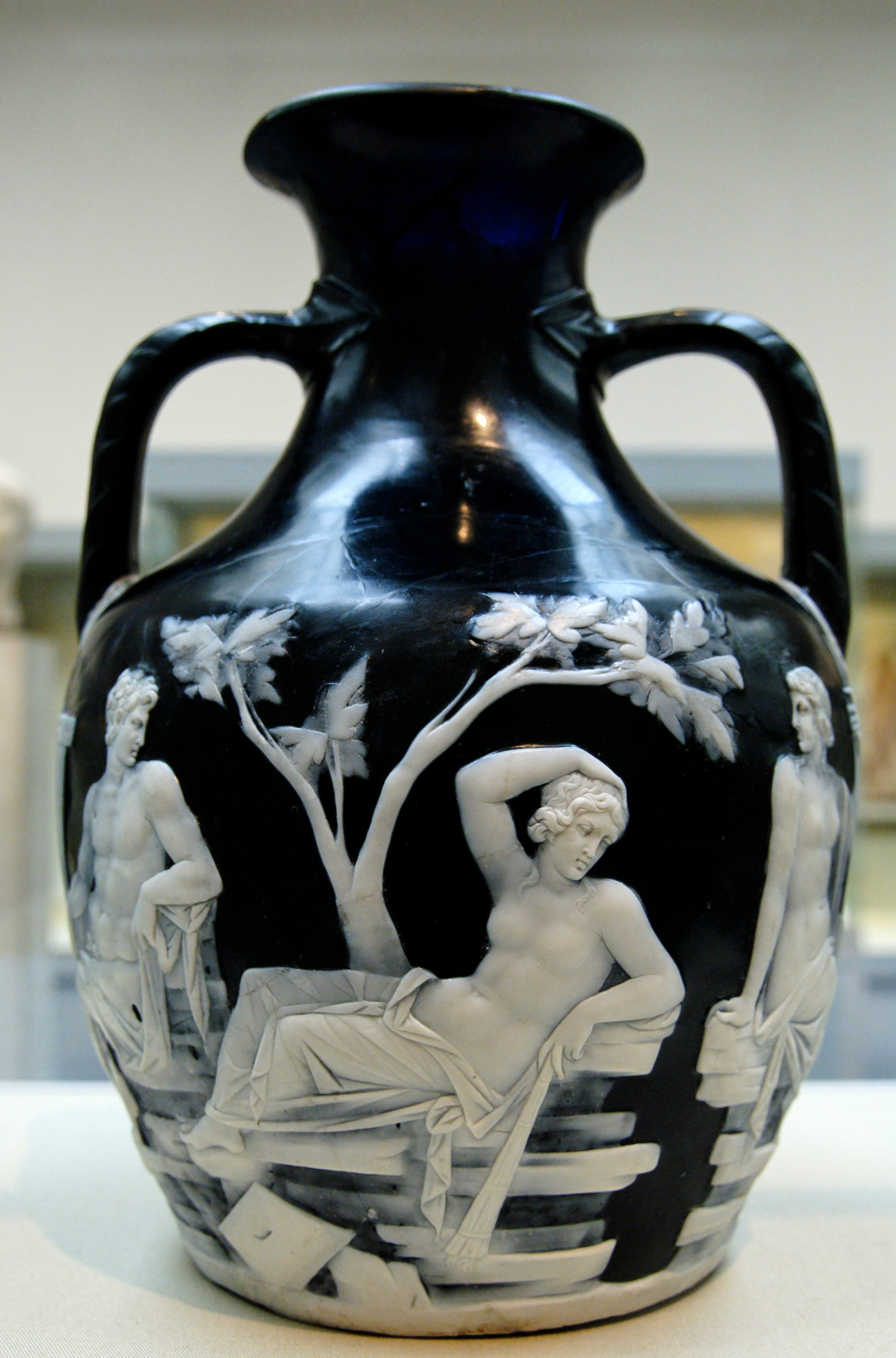
The other side of the Portland Vase

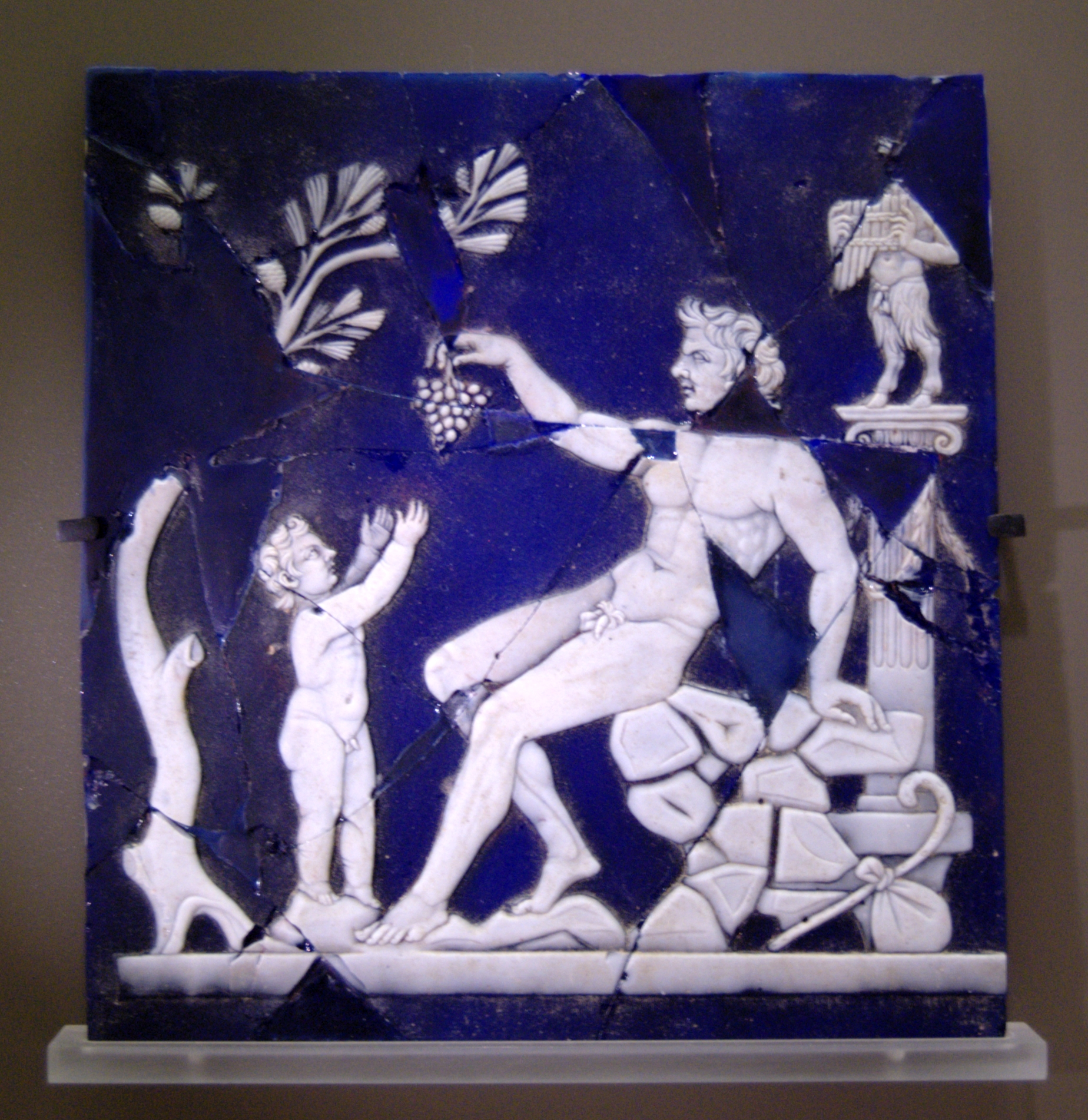
Satyr giving grapes to the infant Bacchus, first century

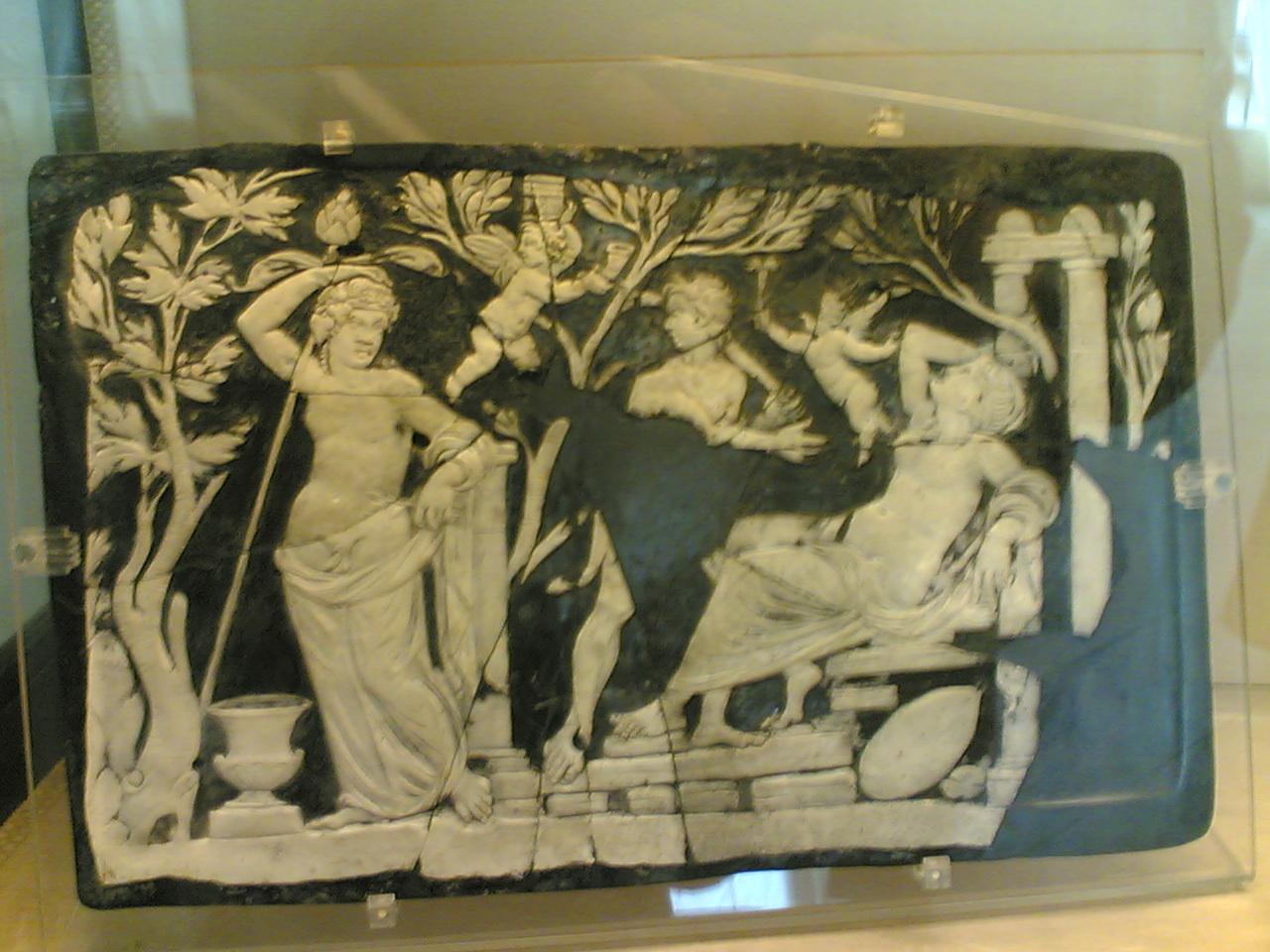
The initiation of Ariadne into the Dionysian mysteries, from Pompeii

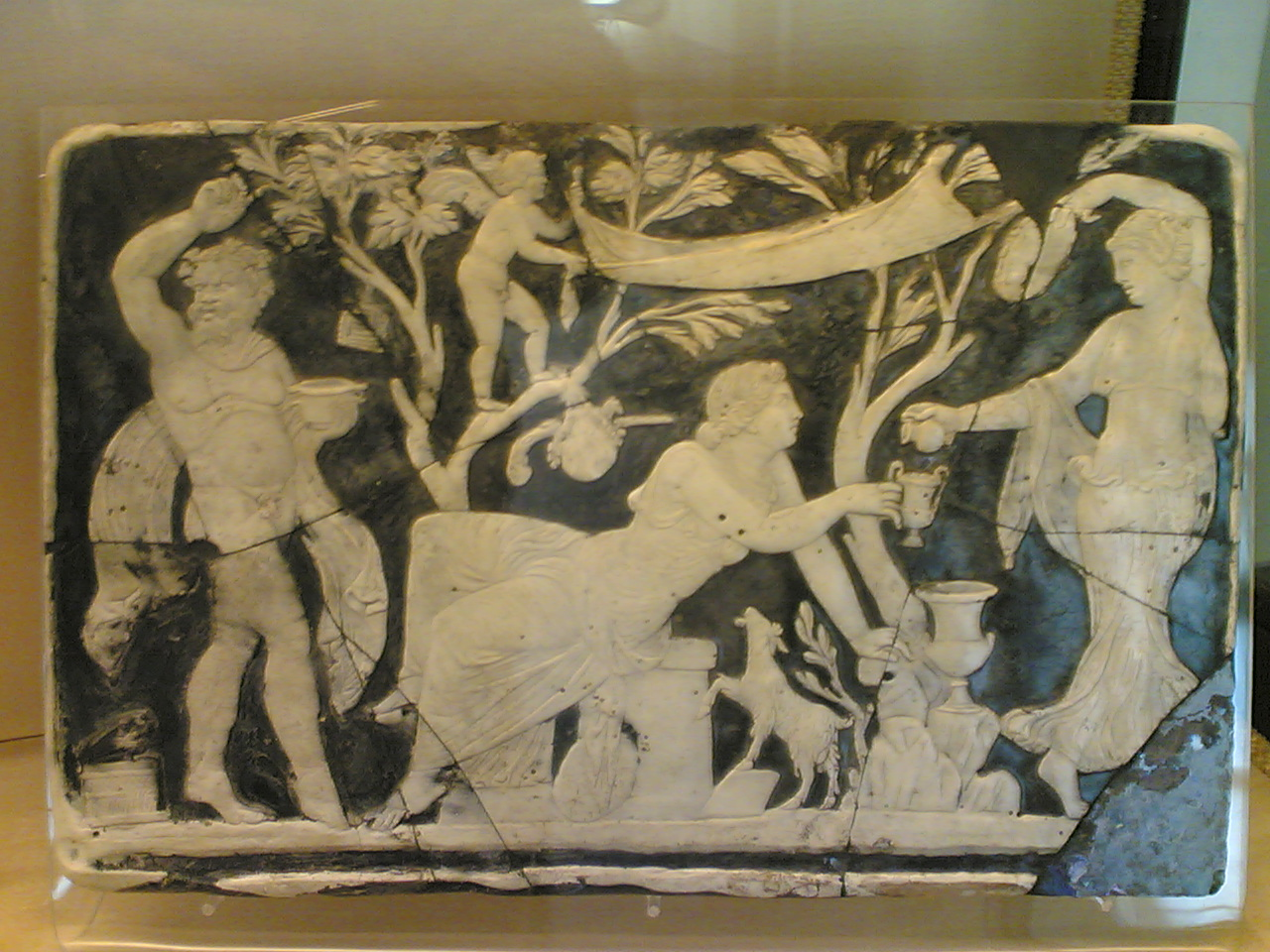
Companion panel

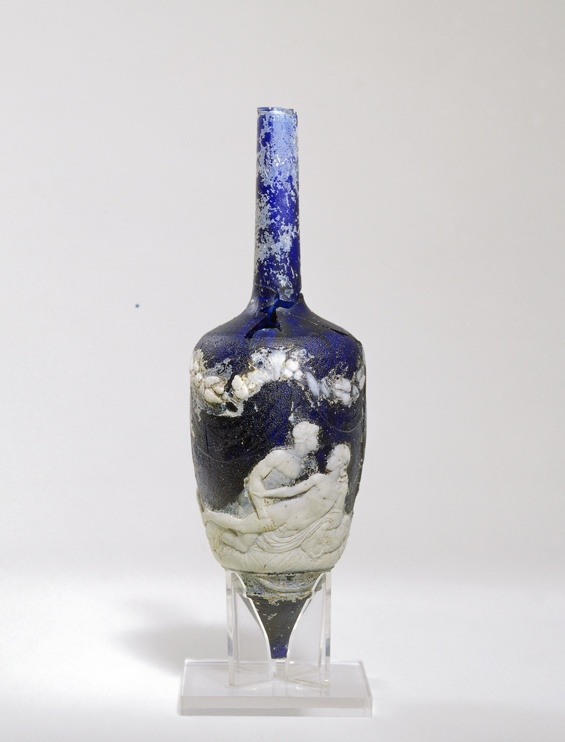
Perfume bottle made of cameo glass showing homoerotic scene found in the Roman necropolis of Ostippo (Spain).

== Later periods ==
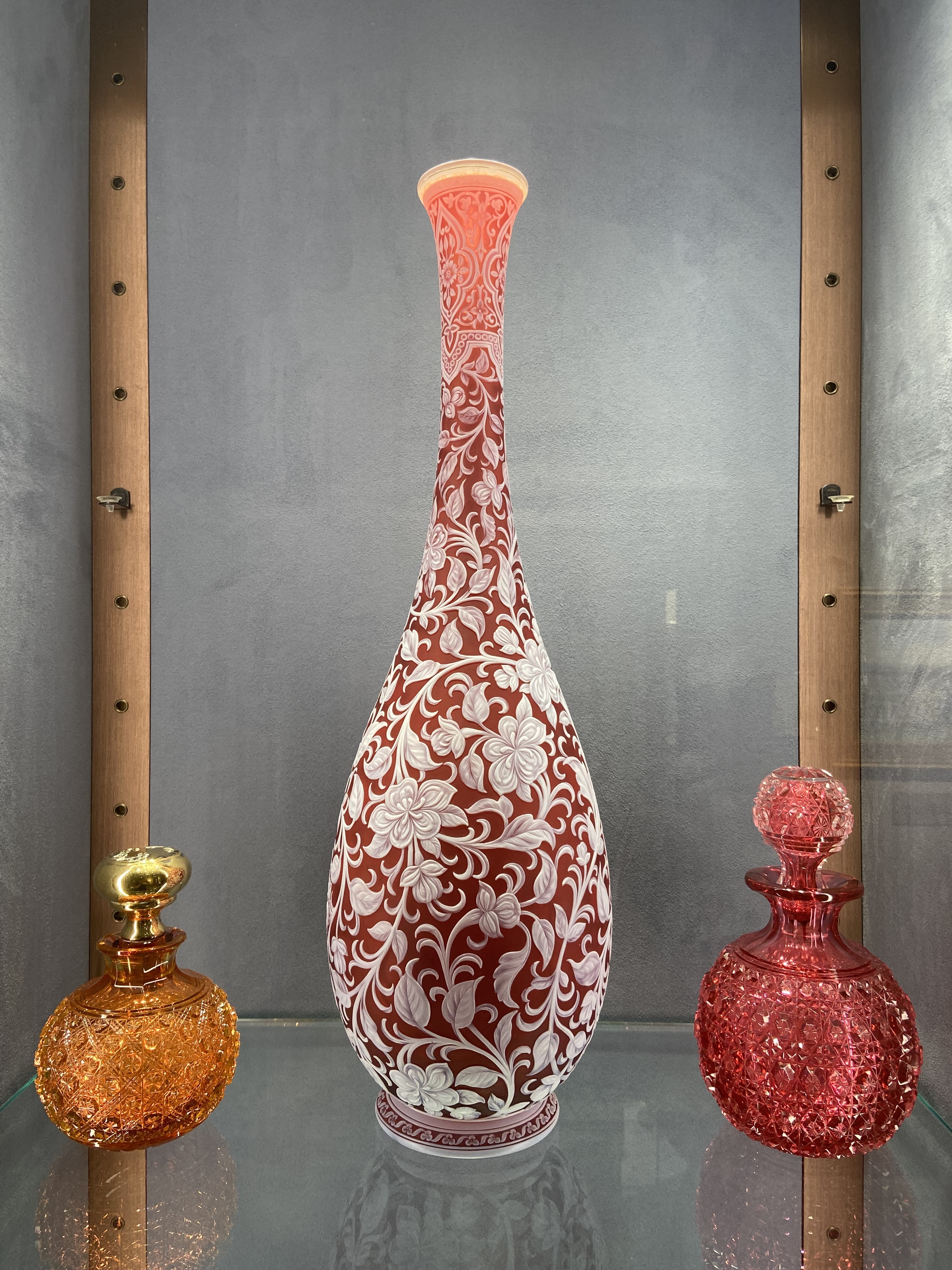
Cameo Glass Vase by George Woodall at Thomas Webb & Sons, exhibited at 1889 Exposition Universelle

The cameo technique was used in Islamic art in the 9th and 10th centuries (e.g. in the Corning Ewer), but then lost until the 18th century in Europe, and not perfected until the 19th century. Nineteenth-century English producers of true cameo glass include Thomas Webb and Sons and George Bacchus & Sons, although ceramic imitations made popular by Wedgwood's bi-colored "jasper ware", imitated by others from the late 18th century onward, are far more common. Like Wedgwood's designers, they usually worked in a more or less neoclassical style. The French medalist Alphonse Eugène Lecheverel, whose work for Richardson's was exhibited in Paris in 1878. Outstanding English cameo glass artisans were Philip Pargeter (1826–1906) and John Northwood (1836–1902), who first successfully reproduced the Portland Vase in cameo glass. and George Woodall. Cameo glass, roughed out by the etching process provided a popular substitute for genuine cameos in brooches and plaques and similar uses, and there are still many producers today.

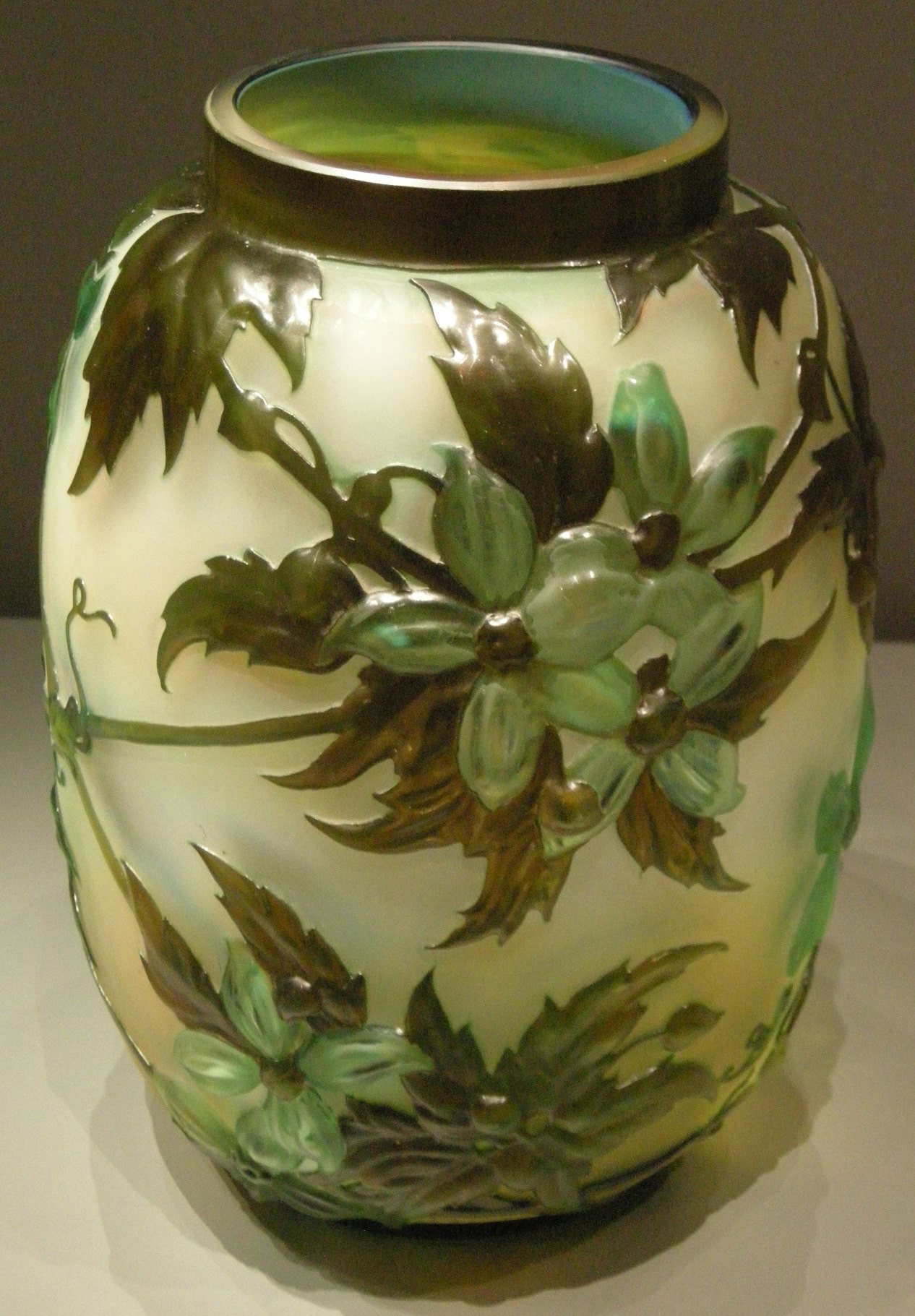
Cameo glass vase by Établissements Gallé, ca. 1925

Artistically the most notable work since the revival was in the Art Nouveau period, by makers such as Émile Gallé (1846–1904) and Daum of Nancy, when Roman-inspired subjects and color schemes were totally abandoned, and plant and flower designs predominate. Louis Comfort Tiffany made only a small number of cameo pieces, which were a French specialty in this period, though other firms such as the Czech Moser Glass were also producers.

== Peking glass ==
Introduction of glass-working methods by Jesuits resulted in a Chinese form of Cameo glass, Peking glass. As with European Cameo glass, a textured image is created by carving away layers of glass from the core object.

== Techniques ==
In the modern revival all of the top layer except the areas needed for the design are usually removed by an etching process—the figure areas are covered with a resist layer of wax or some other acid-resistant material such as bituminous paint, and the blank repeatedly dipped in hydrofluoric acid, so that cameo glass is in some sense a sub-set of acid-etched glass. The detailed work is then done with wheels and drills, before finishing, and usually polishing. It seems that in the ancient world the entire process of removing the unwanted white or other top layer was done by drills and wheels—wheel-cut decoration on glass of a single color was very common in ancient Rome. In the case of "three-layer" (or three-color) cameo, there is another layer of glass on top of the white opaque one, and further layers are possible. One Roman piece uses a record six layers. It is not known where the Roman pieces were produced, but for want of any better suggestion most scholars think in the capital itself. It appears likely that at least the making of the blanks was initially in the hands of imported Syrian glass-workers.

== Contemporary innovations ==
In the 21st century, artists have developed new methods for producing cameo glass using digital tools and non-traditional mold-making processes. One contemporary approach involves designing detailed relief imagery using 3D modeling software and producing a positive form with a 3D printer. This form is then duplicated using an intermediary mold material to produce a final refractory mold, bypassing traditional wax-carving or acid etching methods. Unlike traditional cameo glass, which relies on engraving or acid etching to remove material, this method controls tonal contrast through variations in glass relief depth rather than surface carving. By layering glass and employing precise mold-making techniques, it achieves continuous tone imagery with subtle shading effects, differing from the stark contrast of traditional cameo work. This innovative approach was recognized in New Glass Review 39 by the Corning Museum of Glass, highlighting its impact on modern kiln-glass practices.

== See also ==
- Cased glass
- Flashed glass
- Gold glass
