= George Bacchus & Sons =

George Bacchus & Sons, originally called Bacchus & Green was a 19th-century manufacturer of fine glassware located in Birmingham, England.

In the 1830s Bacchus produced pressed glass by using a plunger to force molten glass into a cast-iron mold. In the 1850s, they began making cased glass, which has thin layers of different colors which can be cut away to produce cameo glass.

Bacchus also produced cut glass items, including Venetian-style paperweights and tableware.
