= Anne Dybka =

Australian artist (1921–2007)

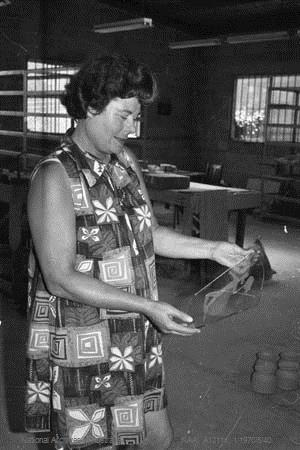
- Dybka with a glass engraving
- Born: Anne Hutchings; 4 September 1921; Portsmouth, England
- Died: 11 May 2007 (aged 85); Sydney, Australia
- Known for: Glass engraving

Anne Dybka OAM (1921–2007) was an English Australian artist and glass engraver. After training and study in painting, drawing, glass engraving and graphic arts, Dybka went on to create works which are on display in Australian public collections. Dybka's works are privately owned by Hua Guofeng, the former Chinese premier, Lord Snowdon, Sir Roden Cutler and Neville Wran.

== Biography ==
Dybka was born Anne Ruth Mary Hutchings on 4 September 1921 in Portsmouth, England, and she died at age 85 in Sydney, Australia on 11 May 2007. Her father, Capt. John Hutchings remembered as "Mad Hutch" was a submariner and commander in the Royal Navy. Little is known about her life in Britain, however at an early stage of life, Dybka began undertaking artistic study and training.

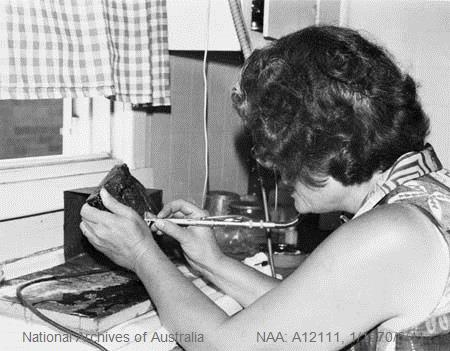
Anne Dybka practices glass engraving

In her early life she completed studies in painting and drawing with Martin Bloch in London. She also studied graphic arts at London Polytechnic. Dybka was a fellow of London's guild of glass engravers, and is one of only two known people to use the cameo technique.

=== Early life ===
Dybka was married at age 19 to her first husband Henry James Thompson (known as Peter). Her first marriage bore four children, whose names are Sarah, Gill, Michael and Tony. It was with her first husband and four children that Dybka migrated to Australia in 1956. Whilst in Australia, Dybka undertook studies at the National Gallery of Victoria Art School, and also studied under George Bell in Melbourne.

Dybka's second marriage was to Rudolf Dybka, who was an Austrian ceramic artist, who had migrated to Australia through the Australian Austrian Assisted Passage Scheme. Rudolf and Anne Dybka worked together in studios across Parramatta throughout the 1960s and 70s. In 1968, as a married couple, Rudolf and Anne established a pottery studio in their backyard in Rydalmere in Sydney.

Dybka's third partner was Eddy Mills, who was an engraver from the East End of London. Their partnership lasted more than 25 years when she died in 2007.

== Glasswork ==
=== Training undertaken ===
Dybka undertook a range of training in London and furthered this after her migration to Australia. From 1938 to 1944, Dybka undertook training in Painting and Drawing with Martin Bloch in London, UK. Following the completion of this training, she studied graphic arts at London Polytechnic, London, UK from 1948 to 1949. After migrating to Australia, Dybka continued her training and studied at the George Bell School in Melbourne in the late 1950s.

During her career as an artist, Dybka had worked for Guy Boyd, as a decorator, and as a glass designer for Old Chelsea glassware. Dybka had professional experience working with Crown Crystal Glass in Sydney in the years 1970–1976 as a glass decoration designer. Following this, she had many years in glass engraving. Along with this experience and training, allowed Dybka to experiment with different methods of engraving.

=== Career ===
In 1967 Dybka, together with her then husband, Rudolf Dybka, collaborated with Vladmir Tichy, who was a Czech born ceramic sculptor who had arrived in Australia in 1968. This collaboration culminated in a studio, which was named Dybka Tichy in Parramatta, between both Rudolf and Anne, and Vladmir. One of the production managers employed at the studio, Joe Sartori, described the work of the studio as producing architectural murals, handmade tiles and decorative and functional pottery. The works were supplied to Grace Bros and Waltons department stores, which were prominent in Australia throughout the 1970s and onward. Rudolf Dybka left this partnership in 1974 and moved to Victoria to continue his work in pottery. The studio was ultimately renamed Studio Tichy and Partners, following the departure of the Dybka's. It is thought that this is when his marriage to Anne dissolved, as Anne continued to live and work in NSW.

In 1978, Dybka established her own art studio in the Argyle Arts Centre, in The Rocks in Sydney, on Playfairs Terrace. Playfairs Terrace is a heritage-listed row of four Victorian style houses. They contribute to the historic urban character of The Rocks, and are now home to the Argyle Gallery, which features Australian artists and Aboriginal artwork. Dybka diligently worked five days a week on the third floor of the Argyle Arts Centre located in Sydney working on sketches, drawings, and cutting glass. She described glass engraving such that "each piece must be a work of art…or it isn't good enough". Whilst working in the argyle centre, Dybka used to hang a sign that asked that visitors only disturb the artist if they were genuinely interested in speaking to her about her art, as other distractions weren't welcome as she concentrated on her work. She is quoted as saying that "Glass Engraving is a precise art…You can't hide any little mistake that a lapse in concentration can easily cause". Dybka operated continuously in this studio until she retired in 2005.

Dybka is still listed as a notable resident of The Rocks, given her contributions to the area, however the works surviving Dybka in this area are not described as being an accurate reflection of her works. They are considered to be incidental to her residing in this space.

In 1995, Dybka was awarded the Australia Council Emeritus Fellowship award. This fellowship is awarded to support outstanding established artists creative activity. It was awarded on the basis of her contributions which were deemed worthy of greater public recognition, which would inspire other artists. At age 82 in 2003, Dybka was awarded the Order of Australia Medal (OAM).

Dybka is known to have engraved crystal for Orrefors glassworks, in the Swedish province of Småland which is known as the "Kingdom of Crystal"; for Baccarat, a French manufacturer of crystal; and for Lalique, a French glass design house.

== Exhibitions and works ==
=== Solo exhibitions ===
- Georges, Melbourne 1970
- Distelfink Gallery, Melbourne 1983
- Beaver Galleries, Canberra 1992
- Blaxland Gallery, Sydney 1993
- David Jones, Sydney 1993
- Meat Market Craft Centre, Melbourne 1994
- JamFactory Craft and Design Centre Gallery, Adelaide 1995

=== Group exhibitions ===
- London Guild of Glass Engravers, 1980
- Life Through Glass, Sydney Opera House, Sydney 1987

=== Life Through Glass (1987) ===
Life Through Glass (1987) was the first group exhibition of Australian Glass Engraving, and was dedicated entirely to showcasing glass. Dybka, along with Patricia Robinson, Annette Kalnins, Cecil Renfield and Alasdair C Gordon all contributed to the exhibition, which had a focus on the methods of presentation of the glass works. Dybka collaborated with a hologram expect, Paul Dawson on a series of holograms that would incorporate Dybka's engraving. She also had her works of engraved glass lit up by fibre optics, which created a magical effect, and in some cases optical illusion.

=== Works in the Beaver Galleries ===
In 1989, Dybka's works were on display at the Beaver Gallery in Deakin, which was showcasing sculptured glass and jewellery. The exhibit was called Sculptured Beauty of Glass and Jewellery. Dybka presented her works alongside Patricia Robinson and Annette Kalnins. Dybka had been working alongside Patricia Robinson since 1984 with Robinson noting that her own work had evolved over this time, as they worked together. As part of this exhibit, Dybka commented that she preferred using "subjects which had life and movement", drawing on themes from poetry, drama and the natural world. On display, were several of Dybka's major works, which included five blocks on optical glass with a depiction of Shakespeare's The Tempest. These pieces, when viewed from different angles, would display further pictures, making them appear as though they were in the glass. This was achieved in conjunction with Annette Kalnins, and her work in the electronics industry. Dybka also engraved on blown glass pieces by Julio Santos, Brian Hurst and Setsuko Ogishi. Setsuko Ogishi's Rainbow Butterflies featured different coloured glass, influenced by the glass in which they were engraved. Dybka also collaborated with and combined works with jewellers Tony Kean and Angela Morrell to produce pendants, brooches and earrings as part of this exhibition.

In 1990, Dybka contributed again to the Beaver Gallery. The gallery owner, Betty Beaver, was well known for her collection of merry-go-round, carousel and nursery book whimsical themed works. As part of this exhibition, 18 artists were given a copy of a book titled “The Carousel Animal”, and invited to contribute a work for inclusion in the exhibition. Dybka created a miniature engraved glass carousel, which revolved to the music used to greet guests to the gallery. The carousel featured four different horses, being a war horse, a riderless winged horse, a sea horse and a spirited poet's horse. The horses on the carousel were carved by Dybka, which was noted to be unusual, as typically this effect would have been achieved using a technique known as the intaglio effect. Dybka attended the breakfast opening of the exhibition alongside other artists who had contributed to the collection, and socialites.

== Collections and displayed works ==
=== Works in collections ===
==== Public collections (Australia) ====
- National Gallery of Australia, Canberra
- National Gallery of Victoria, Melbourne
- Parliament House, Canberra
- Powerhouse Museum, Sydney
- Queensland Art Gallery, Brisbane
- Wagga Wagga Regional Art Gallery, Wagga Wagga

==== Public collections (international) ====
- The Glasmuseum, Ebeltoft, Denmark

=== Commissioned works ===
==== Biggles the miniature schnauzer ====
Situated at Atherden & Playfair Streets in The Rocks, stands a bronze statue that Dybka was chosen to produce. The statue is of a miniature schnauzer, constructed in the likeness of a dog local to the area known as Biggles. Biggles was well known in The Rocks community, and regarded as a local character by the residents and shop keepers. Biggles's owner, Trevor Kelly would ride around on his motorcycle, with Biggles on the back of a milk crate. The statue is situated outside of where his owner lives. The statue was commissioned following the death of Biggles after he leapt off of a cliff in pursuit of a rat at Mrs Macquarie's Chair. Dybka was chosen as a local artist to immortalise Biggles, as an important character to the area, and the statue was unveiled on 16 March 1995.

==== Government commissions ====
Dybka was commissioned for gifts from the governments of NSW and Tasmania to give to the foreign heads of states. She was also commissioned to work on public buildings in Sydney, which included a shrine and carved glass pulpit eagle, which is in St Brigid's Church in North Sydney.

The Senate Chamber of Parliament House in Australia features Dybka's engraving for the shield of state crests, and the slumped glass Commonwealth Star, which sits behind the president's chair.
