= Sangir =

Sangir, Sangihe, Sangi or Sanghir may refer to:

- Sangihe Islands (Kepulauan Sangir), an archipelago in Indonesia
- Sangir people, native people of the Sangir Islands
- Sangir language, spoken on the Sangir Islands
- Sangihe Island (Sangihe Besar), the largest of the Sangir Islands
- Sangir, Central Asia, in the Kimek Khanate
- Mohammad Sanghir (or Mohammed Saghir), a former extrajudicial captive in the Guantanamo Bay detention camps

== See also ==
- Sangi (disambiguation)
