= Jacob Sang =

Dutch glass engraver

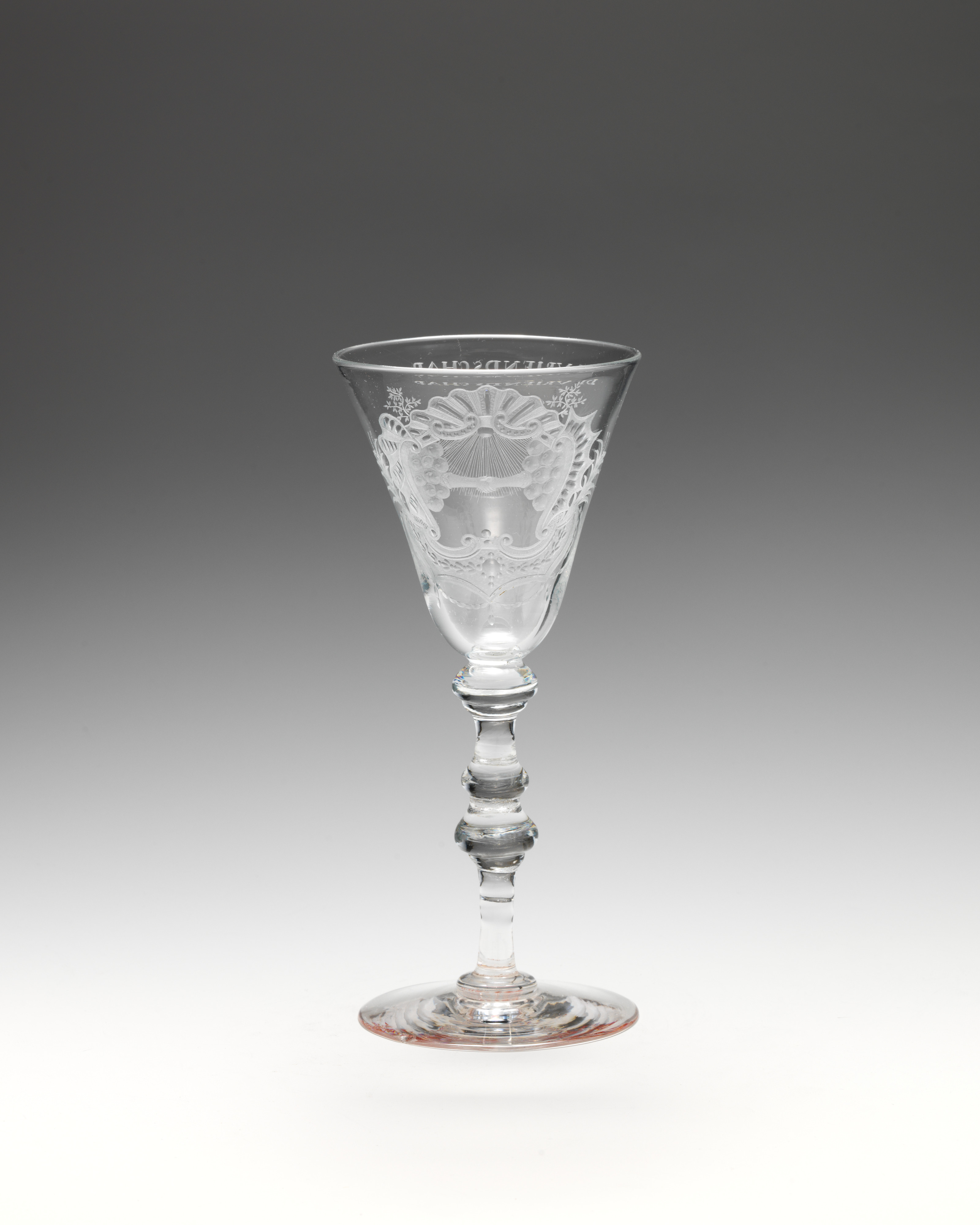
A wineglass engraved by Jacob Sang.

Jacob Sang, also known as Simon Jacob Sang, (c. 1720-1786) was an 18th-century Dutch glass engraver. Active in Amsterdam from 1752 to 1762, he engraved wine glasses, goblets and cups. His work can be found in the Metropolitan Museum of Art in New York City, the Art Institute of Chicago, the British Museum and the Victoria and Albert Museum in London, the Rijksmuseum in Amsterdam, the Gemeentemuseum Den Haag in The Hague, and the National Gallery of Victoria in Australia. A goblet engraved by Sang was auctioned by Christie's for more than €20,000 in 2007 and another one by Bonhams for £24,000 in 2008.
