= Pepita glass engraving =

Pepita glass engraving (Spanish: grabado de pepita en vidrio) is a technique of engraving on glass used by artisans of Mexico, in which an aluminum oxide grinding stone or wheel is used in a grinding machine to manually carve out patterns of small, decorative pepita-like shapes in glass objects. Machine-made, molded glass products are also manufactured in a style that mimics the artisanal technique.

== History ==
According to studio glass craftsman José Cruz Guillén, the tradition first began in the Netherlands in the 15th century (most glass historians trace it to Venice instead, though the Netherlands were important later). It was then brought to Germany and Spain, and then to Mexico in 1524 when Rodrigo de Espinoza opened Mexico's first glass factory, in Puebla. De Espinoza brought a group of Spanish artisans to teach the natives, who began to blend their own pre-Hispanic designs with the introduced glass blowing techniques, evolving the style now recognized as pepita.
