= Flashed glass =

Type of decorative glass

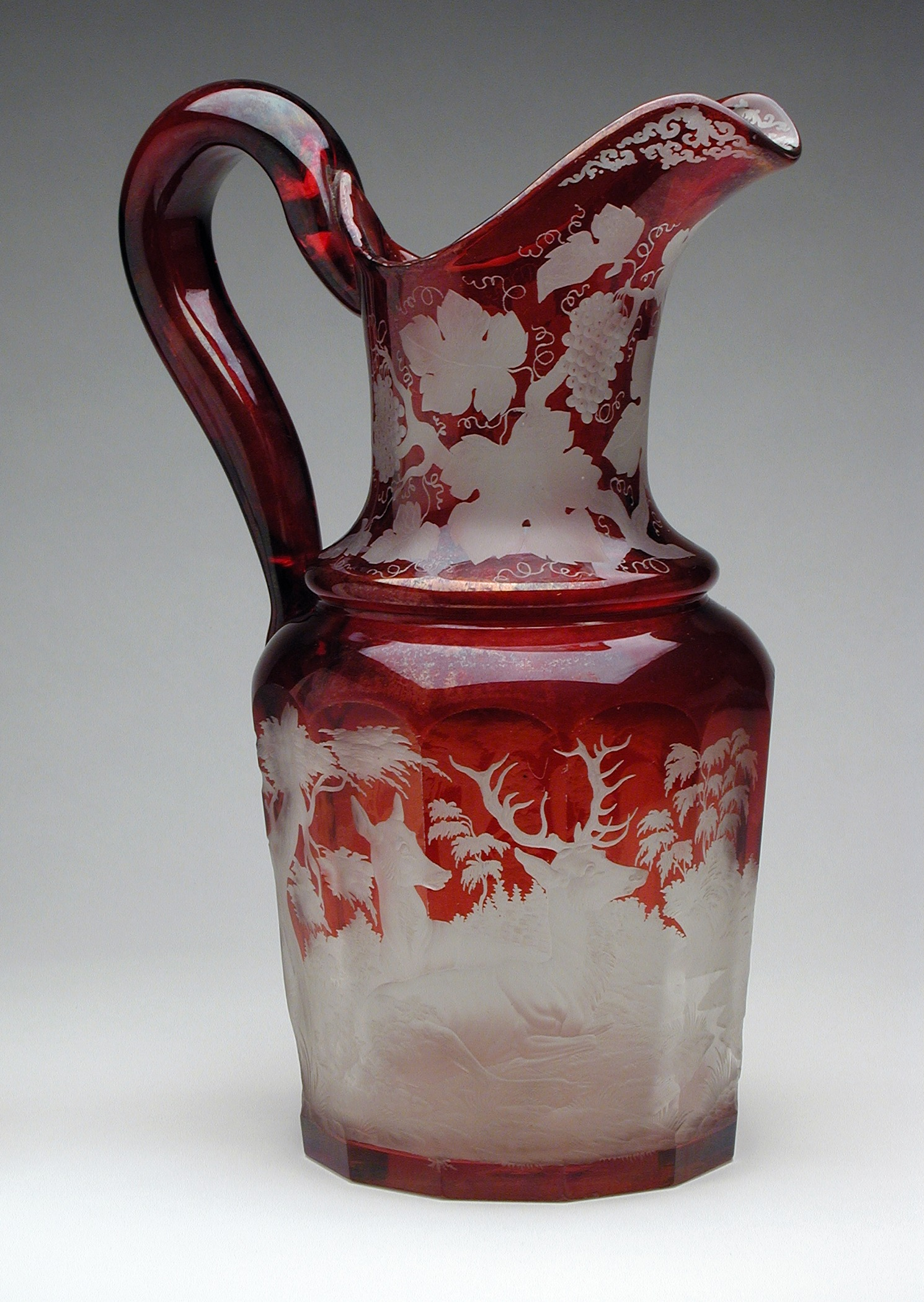
Ruby flashed glass

Flashed glass, or flash glass, is a type of glass created by coating a colorless gather of glass with one or more thin layers of colored glass. This is done by placing a piece of melted glass of one color into another piece of melted glass of a different color and then blowing the glass.

As well as its use for glass vessels, it has been very widely used in making stained glass since medieval times, often in combination with "pot metal glass", made by colouring molten glass, giving colour all through the sheet.

The colored glass can be partly or completely etched away (through exposure to acid or via sandblasting), resulting in colorless spots where the colored glass has been removed.

Flashed glass can be made from various colors of glass. A finished piece of flashed glass appears translucent.

== See also ==
- Cased glass
- Glass engraving
- Satsuma Kiriko cut glass
- Stained glass
