= Rosemary Chepkorir Sang =

Kenyan virologist

- Citizenship: Kenya
- Occupation: virologist

Rosemary Chepkorir Sang is a Kenyan virologist at the Kenya Medical Research Institute, who specialises in the transmission and treatment of arboviruses. She has a PhD in zoology and an MSc in medical virology and entomology. She has investigated several major outbreaks of arbovirus in East Africa. She has been outspoken on the need for African countries to be part of global policy discussions on climate change. During the COVID-19 pandemic she expressed concern about the welfare of street children. She has been a member of a number of Expert Committees for the World Health Organization, including on International Health Regulation, and Rift Valley fever. She was elected a Fellow of the African Academy of Sciences in 2014.

== Selected publications ==
- Crabtree M, Sang R, Miller BR. Kupe Virus, a New Virus in the Family Bunyaviridae, Genus Nairovirus, Kenya. Emerg Infect Dis. 2009;15(2):147-154.
- Sergon, Kibet, et al. "Seroprevalence of chikungunya virus (CHIKV) infection on Lamu Island, Kenya, October 2004." The American journal of tropical medicine and hygiene 78.2 (2008): 333-337.
- Sang, Rosemary, et al. "Rift Valley fever virus epidemic in Kenya, 2006/2007: the entomologic investigations." The American journal of tropical medicine and hygiene 83.2 Suppl (2010): 28.
- Aubry, Fabien, et al. "Enhanced Zika virus susceptibility of globally invasive Aedes aegypti populations." Science 370.6519 (2020): 991-996.
