= Peking glass =

Type of glass

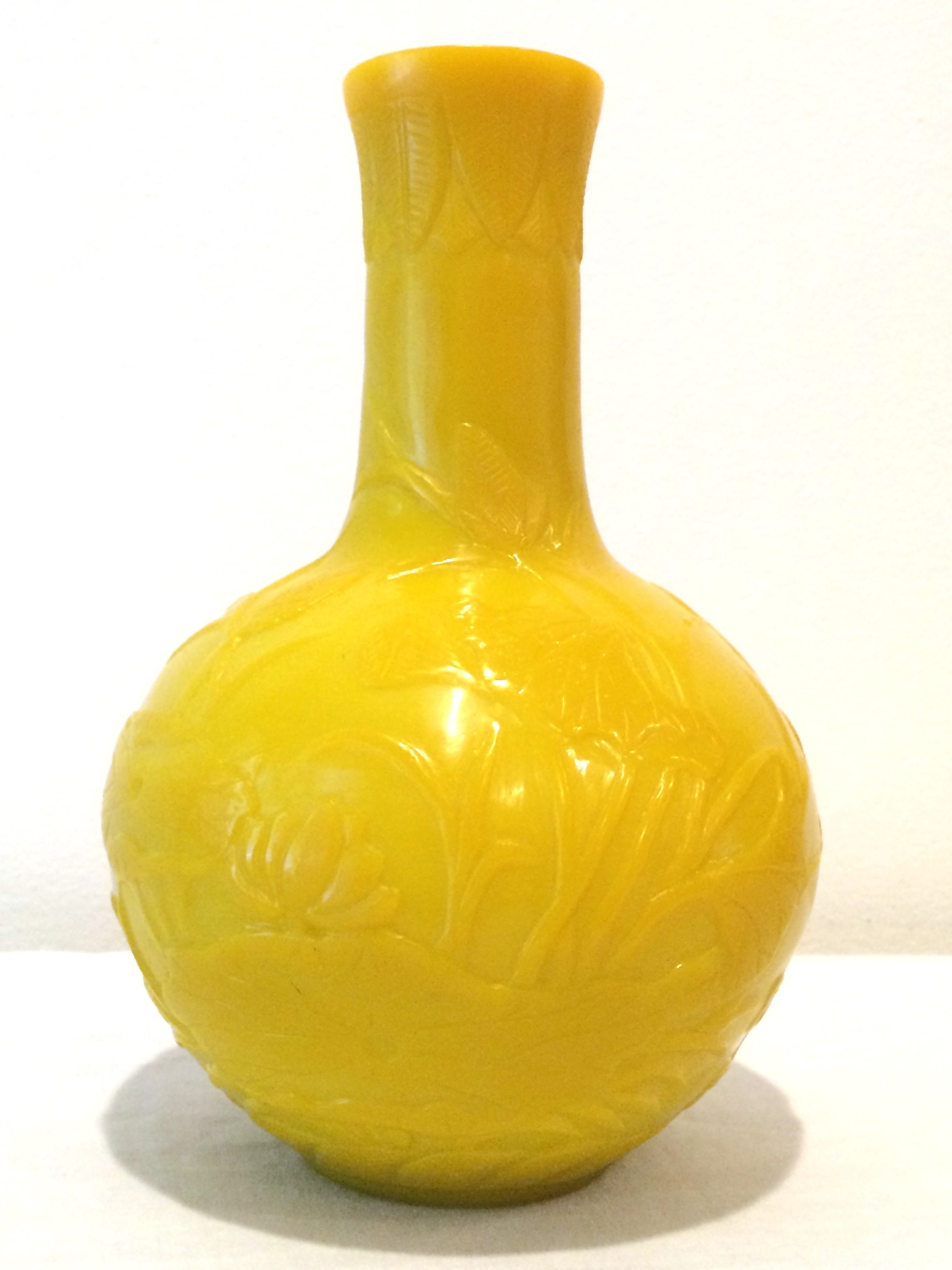
A Peking glass vase with lotus pattern from the Daoguang period. The color is named "Imperial Yellow" in reference to the banner of the Qing dynasty.

Peking glass, also known as Kangxi Glass, Qianlong Glass or Tao Liao Ping, is a form of Chinese glassware that originated in 18th century Beijing, China (then romanized as "Peking" in European writings). Originally used in the fabrication of glass snuff bottles, Peking glass has since been appropriated for a number of uses and continues to be produced in China.

== History ==
Peking glass originated in 18th century China during the rule of the Qing dynasty. While China had long been a major producer of glassware, the introduction of European technologies to Asia in the 17th century caused a shift in the styles of Chinese glass makers. The principle couriers of these technologies were Jesuit missionaries, who introduced modern glass-making methods from Italy to China, which was at the time closed to the West. The advances spurred by the Jesuits led the Kangxi Emperor to establish an Imperial glass-works in 1696 to better produce the new material. The glass was commonly used in snuff bottles and vases, where it was used to imitate the harder to work jade and other precious stones. Eventually, the process of creating Peking glass was spread outside of the imperial glass-works and into the general population, leading to many artisans adopting Peking glass as a medium. The golden age of Peking glass in China is widely cited as being the reign of the Qianlong Emperor in the mid-18th century. Though the art-form declined after the 19th century, the production of Peking glass continued in China through the Republican period and into the present day.

== Creation ==
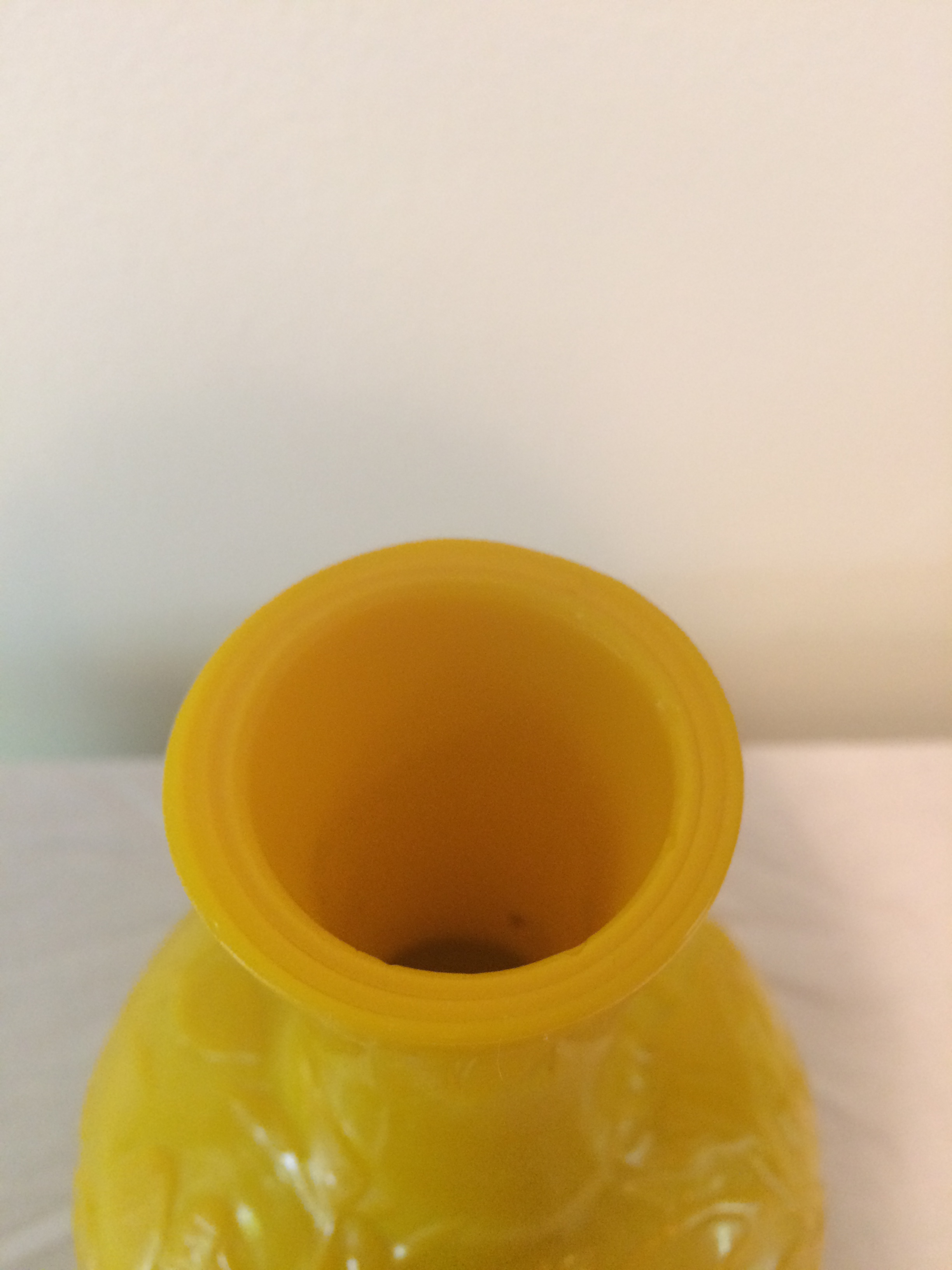
Image of the brim of the vase above. The layers of glass that form the vase can be seen.

Peking glass is an overlay carved glass created by layering material around a core, similar to cameo glass. To create the overlay, a glass blower makes the shape, then dips the shape into a basin of liquid glass several times. This process creates multiple layers of glass that are then carved away to produce a textured image. Peking glass is often made with different colored layers of glass, creating contrast when the outer layers are carved away. Historically, many pieces of Peking glass were made with yellow glass (dubbed "Imperial Yellow") due to the colors' strong association with the Qing Imperial clan of Aisin Gioro.

=== Outside China ===
In the late 19th century, glass-works in Czechoslovakia produced imitation Peking glass beads for use as costume jewelry.
