= Cased glass =

Glass made of layers of different colored glass

Cased glass is a type of glass. It has two or more layers of different colored glass. It is similar to flashed glass. However, cased glass is made with thicker glass layers.

== See also ==
- Cameo glass
- Stained glass
