= Corning Ewer =

Islamic cameo ewer

The Corning Ewer
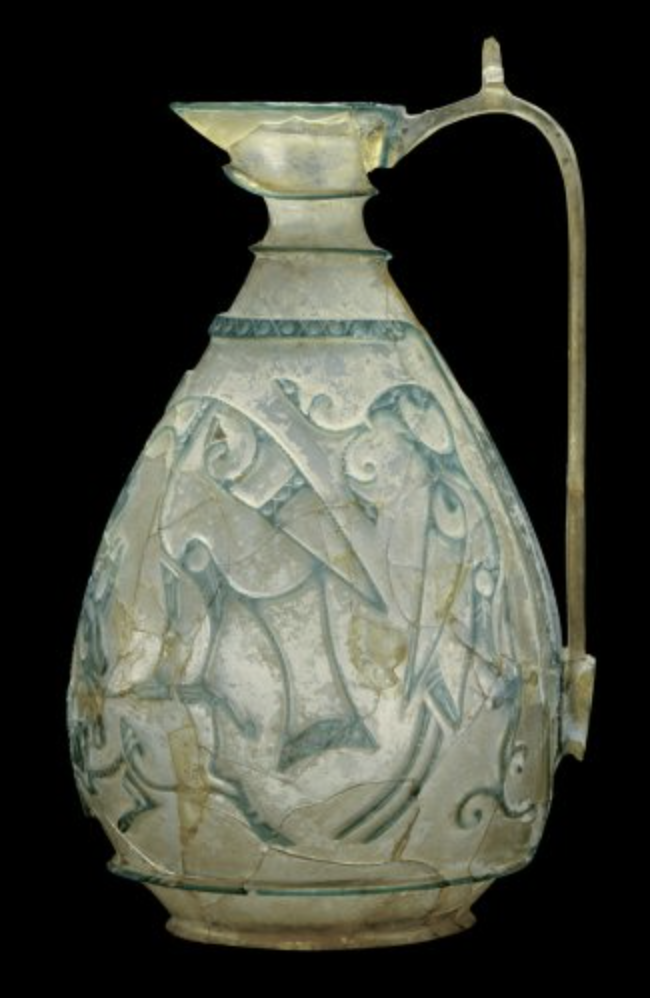
- Year: Early 10th century
- Medium: Islamic Cameo Glass
- Dimensions: 16 cm × 9.3 cm (6.3 in × 3.7 in)
- Location: Corning Museum of Glass, Corning, NY
- Accession: 85.1.1

The Corning Ewer is an Islamic cameo ewer dating back to around AD 1000. The ewer has been described as "the finest known example of Islamic cameo glass." It is named after The Corning Museum of Glass (CMOG), Corning, New York, United States, it was purchased with funds from the Clara S. Peck Endowment. The Corning Ewer was reportedly found in Tehran, Iran. However, the origin of the ewer is unknown. The Corning Ewer bears close resemblances to The Buckley Ewer and the rock crystal ewers produced for Fatimid rulers in Cairo, Egypt.

== Descriptions ==
The Corning Ewer is made of glass by using techniques including blowing, casting, relief-cutting, drilling, and applying. It is made of two layers of glass, with the inner layer being colorless and the outer layer being transparent green. The majority of the outer layer of green glass is then meticulously carved away, forming symmetrical designs of images on its pear-shaped body. The ewer features a thin ribbon handle attached to the lower part of the body and the rim.

Similar to other forms of Islamic art that drew their original influence from Byzantium and Sasanian Persia, Islamic glassmakers also often used various motifs for decorative purposes on glassware. The Corning Ewer also uses various motifs for a decorative effect. Stylized animals are arranged into intricate patterns on the Corning Ewer, with an emphasis on rhythmic repetition. The decorative pattern on the Ewer is an image of two parrot-like birds attacking two horned four-legged animals facing each other, with another two parrot-like birds standing on tree branches behind each attack. This motif of a bird attacking a four-legged animal has been found on other items throughout Egypt and Western Asia. For example, a similar image is found on a Sasanian seal located in the British Museum.

== Manufacture ==
The technique of relief cutting used for making the Corning Ewer was inherited from Roman traditions centuries ago. The glassmaking technique used in The Corning Ewer would also later influence other countries in Europe. Cameo glasses are consisted with two or more layers of different colored glasses. Part of the upper layer is then carved away, leaving low relief decoration in contrast with the lower layer.

Islamic cameo glasses are extremely rare. The restored Islamic cameo glass objects include a pitcher at Corning, a bowl in the Museum of Islamic Art, Cairo, and a cup in the L.A. Mayer Memorial Institute of Islamic Art, Jerusalem. These objects relate to the Corning Ewer due to their resemblance. Like the Corning Ewer, these objects feature images of birds and animals. The pitcher, the bowl, and the cup all originate from Iran, indicating that the Corning Ewer might have its roots in Iran. However, the Corning Ewer also resembles the rock crystal ewers made in Egypt, making its origin ambiguous.

== Significance ==
The Silk Road

Islamic countries made significant contributions to the history of glassmaking. During the Early Islamic Glassmaking period, which spanned from the 8th to 11th century, Islamic glass was traded not only within their countries but also throughout the Mediterranean Sea, East Africa, Russia, and even China. Islamic Glasswares were considered luxury goods, often being traded and exchanged across continents including Asia and Europe. Glasses were either packed on camels or ships as part of the trans-Asian trade along the Silk Road.

== Parallels ==
=== Sasanian seal ===
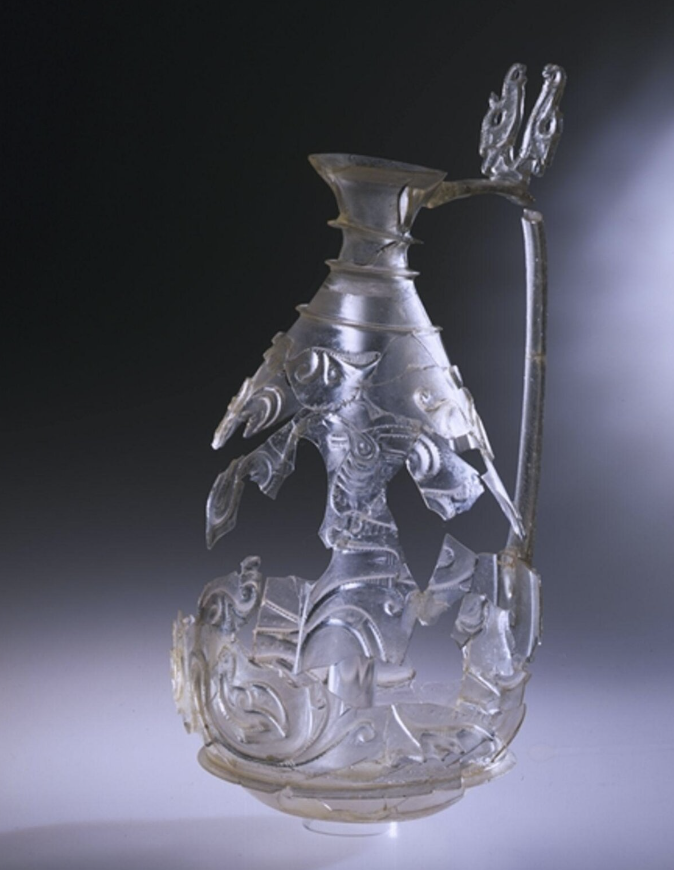
The Buckley Ewer

This motif of a bird attacking a four-legged animal on the Corning Ewer has been found on other items throughout Egypt and Western Asia. For example, a similar image is found on a Sasanian seal located in the British Museum.

=== The Buckley Ewer ===
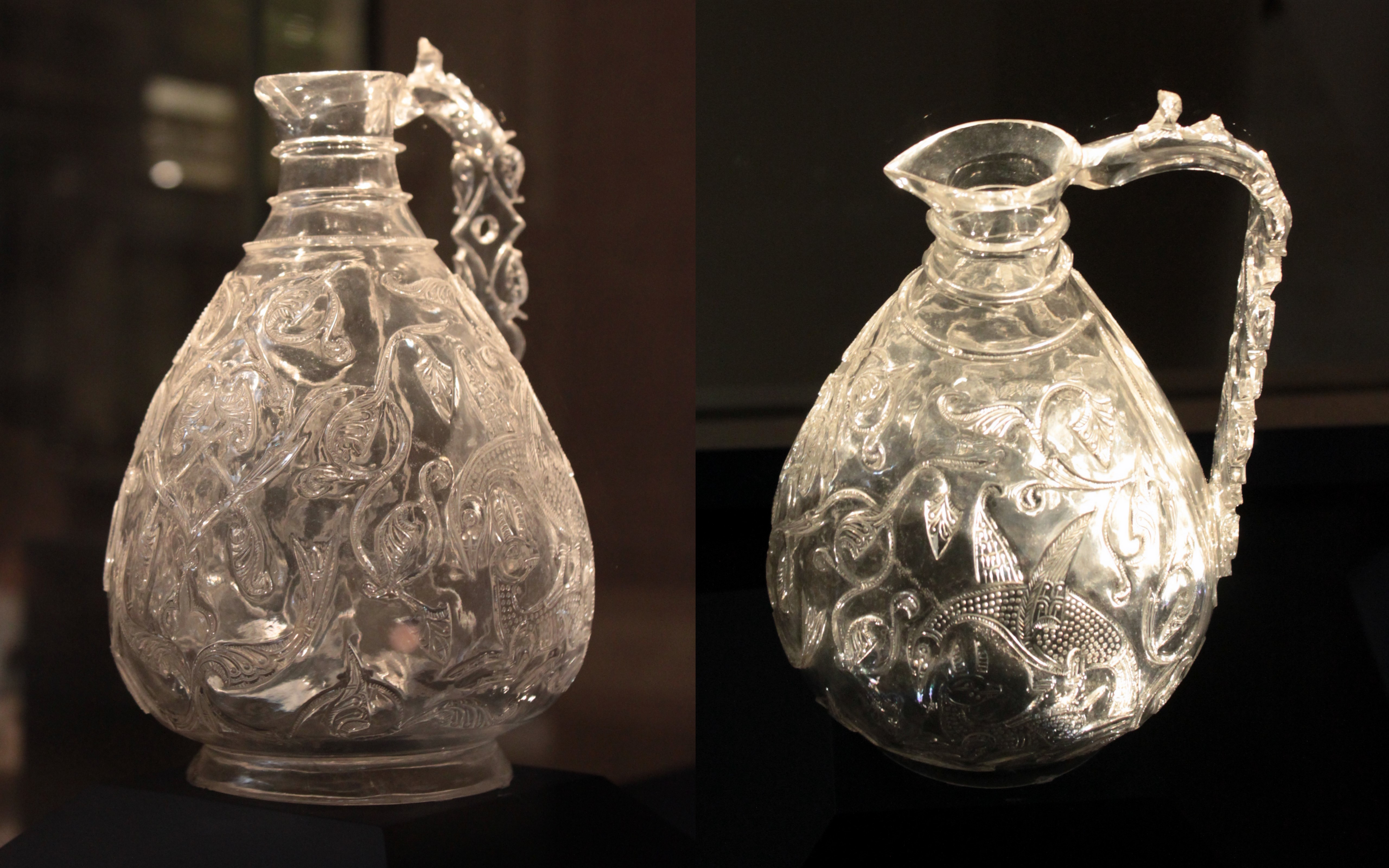
Fatamid rock crystal ewer in Victoria and Albert Museum, London

A close parallel to The Corning Ewer is the Buckley Ewer made around 950-1050. The Buckley Ewer is a colorless relief-cut glass currently housed in the Victoria and Albert Museum in London, England. The shape and the decoration of this ewer such as the thumb-rest in the form of two small birds are based on silver ewers. Both The Corning Ewer and the Buckley Ewer closely resemble Rock crystal ewers made in Cairo, Egypt. Both Ewers are Islamic cameo glasses made with the same relief-cut decoration technique. Their close resemblance suggests that they are possibly cut in the same workshops in Cairo. Although The Corning Ewer and the Buckley Ewer were both found in Iran, it can't be certain that they are Iranian.

=== Rock crystal ewers ===
Rock crystal ewers was specifically made for the rulers of Cairo, Egypt during the Fatimid period (969-1171). These ewers are made out of a single block of rock crystal, a form of pure quartz crystal often imported from Basra, Yemen, and East African Coast islands. It took exceptional skills to hollow out the ewer without shattering the rock crystal. Only about 200 early Islamic carved rock crystals have survived. These rock crystal ewers are rare today because the Treasury in which the Fatimids stored their valuables was looted between the years 1067 and 1072. An example is the Al-'Aziz rock crystal ewer, found in the Treasury of St Mark's Basilica in Venice, Italy.
