= Al-'Aziz rock crystal ewer =

The al-Aziz rock crystal ewer is a Fatimid ewer vessel dated to c. 11th century Cairo. It currently resides in the Treasury of St Mark's Basilica in Venice, Italy. The al-’Aziz ewer is carved from a single piece of rock crystal, standing at approximately 18 centimeters tall with a circular base 12.5 centimeters in diameter. The vessel is pear-like in shape, featuring a wide spout with a narrow neck facilitated by two moldings just above its inscription. Affixed to the ewer is a narrow handle carved from the same piece of rock crystal as the ewer body that extends from the neck down to nearly its base. A figurine of an ibex is affixed to the top of the handle. Below the bottom molding of the ewer is a footring made of gold and enamel, which along with the gold inlaid to the handle, was added in a European workshop that can be dated to the 16th century. The ewer’s body is made of thin walls adorned with unique engravings, the focus of which is a palmette motif whose axis of symmetry aligns with the spout of the ewer. This winding foliate motif extends from the top to the bottom of the ewer, as well as the handle. Flanking either side of the central foliate carvings are engravings of lions, each distinguished by individually carved dots and seated to face the central foliage on the ewer.

== Inscription ==
The al-’Aziz ewer features an Arabic inscription on its body, at the base of the vessel's neck. The inscription reads: “blessing from Allah for the imam al-'Aziz Bi'llah”, referring to the Fatimid caliph of the same name. The inclusion of an Arabic inscription is featured on some other ewers from the "Magnificent Seven" group but otherwise uncommon amongst rock crystal objects. This makes the al-Aziz ewer one of a handful of items that can be securely dated to the Fatimid period, but more precisely to the rule of al-'Aziz Bi'llah (365/975 to 386/996), or what was more likely his successor, al-Hakim bi-Amr Allah (386/996 to 411/1021), as the inscription speaks posthumously to al-’Aziz’s memory. The al-’Aziz ewer is amongst only a couple of other rock crystal objects that can help attribute the craftsmanship of these ewers to Fatimid workshops in Cairo.

== Materials and production techniques ==
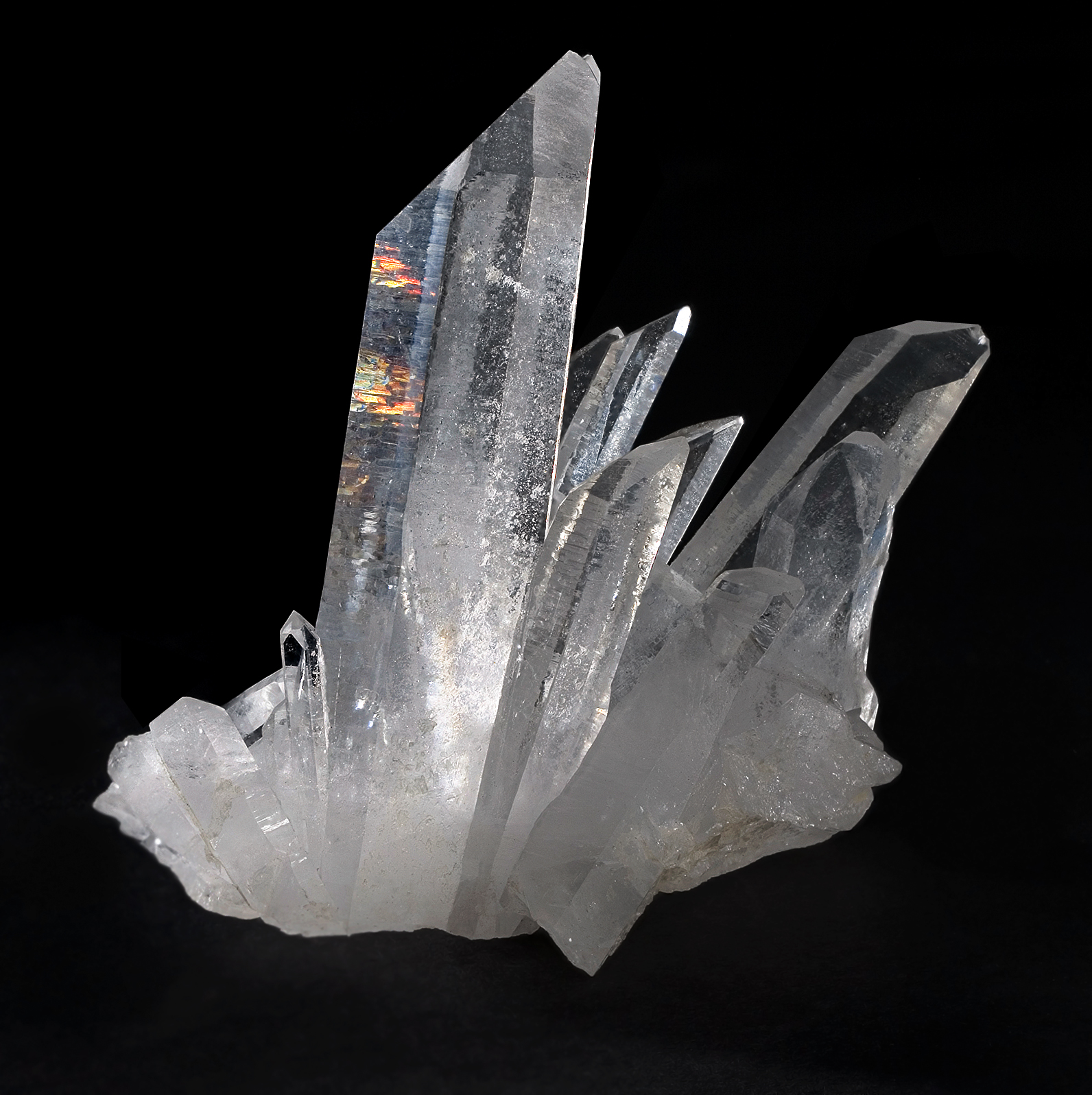
An unrefined cluster of rock crystal in its natural state. This particular example originates from Tibet.

Rock crystal is a notoriously difficult material to carve, as it is situated at a hardness of 7 on the Mohs Scale, requiring a great deal of carefulness and precision for artisans to carve effectively. The al-'Aziz rock crystal Ewer is attributed to c. 1000 Fatimid Egypt like its partner vessels of the “Magnificent Seven,” and were manufactured following similar production techniques. Particular information concerning the manufacturing process of rock crystal vessels such as the al-'Aziz ewer are scarce and can typically be traced to references in medieval Arabic texts written by al-Biruni and al-Tifashi. Fatimid rock crystal vessels were shaped from a single block of rock crystal using steel handheld and rotary tools. Artisans would use steel saws in combination with water and abrasive to create friction and shape raw material into the form of a ewer. It is also speculated that the lathe and attachments such as grinding wheels, cutting discs, and drills were used to shape the object and carve out its interior.

== History and function ==
The al-'Aziz rock crystal ewer would likely have been used by Fatimid elites to store and dispense beverages. Owing to the presence of its identifying inscription, the al-'Aziz ewer is speculated to have served a utilitarian function at banquets and other ceremonial events, holding wine and ceremonial liquids that would be enjoyed by members the Fatimid royal court. The al-'Aziz ewer was part of a larger group of famed ewers, known as the “Magnificent Seven.” All pear-shaped containers made of largely contiguous rock crystal, the ewers are considered some of the rarest and highest-valued objects in the entire sphere of Islamic and Fatimid art in particular, due to the nature of their construction and their cultural significance. With most lacking any inscription or identification, they are all thought to have served in holding wine or other liquids for the court or other important figures. Presently, what is thought to be the seventh and final ewer of the group was purchased in 2008 after appearing at a British auction; the last ewer to come to market before this was purchased by the Victoria and Albert Museum in 1862. This puts the al-'Aziz ewer in scarce company, especially as one of the seven was stolen from the Musée des Beaux-Arts in Limoges in 1980, and another from the Pitti Palace in Florence was accidentally destroyed by a museum employee in 1998.
