= Treasury of St Mark's Basilica =

Church treasure museum in Venice, Italy

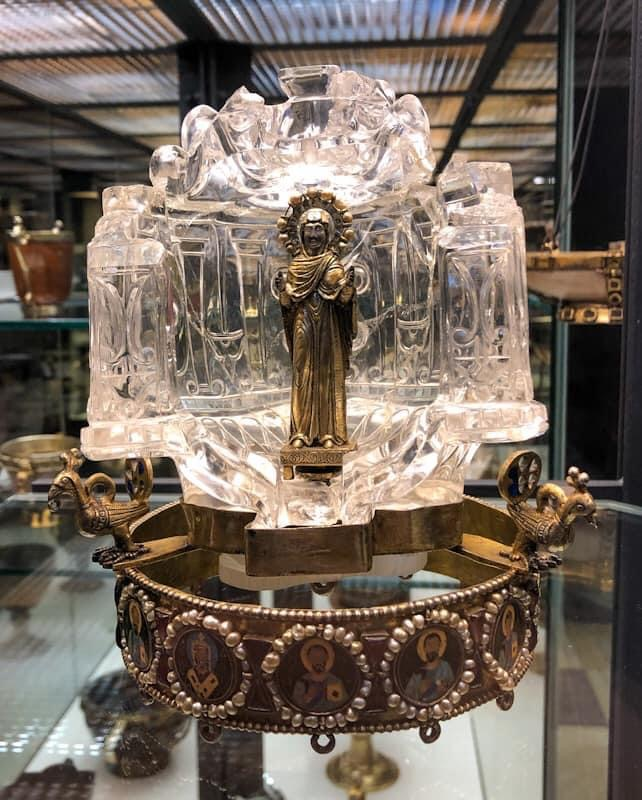
Votive crown of Emperor Leo VI the Wise (late-ninth/early-tenth century), adapted to serve as the base for the 'Grotto of the Virgin' (fourth/fifth century)

The Treasury of St Mark's Basilica contains the church treasure or collection of sacred objects and reliquaries kept in St Mark's Basilica in Venice, Italy. The treasure constitutes the single best collection of Byzantine metalwork and enamels that survives, many of the items having been looted during the Fourth Crusade of 1204. The treasury also contains some significant artworks made for the basilica itself, but no longer used there.

Under the Venetian Republic when St Mark's was the chapel of the doge, it was entrusted to the procurators of Saint Mark who were responsible for the administration and finances of the basilica. Distinguished foreign visitors were allowed to tour the collection, which was also publicly displayed five times a year. Today a large selection of those objects which have survived can be seen by visitors, though much has been lost, in particular during the French occupation of Venice under Napoleon .

== History ==
Reliquaries and precious objects used for the liturgical functions in St Mark's Basilica were initially kept in various locations within the church. The creation of the treasury seems to date to the early thirteenth century when many objects were plundered by the Venetians from the churches, monasteries, and palaces of Constantinople during the sack of the city (1204) in the Fourth Crusade and sent to Venice as spoils of war by Doge Enrico Dandolo who led the Venetian forces. These objects were largely destroyed in a fire in 1231: only a fragment of the True Cross, an ampulla containing the Precious Blood of Christ, and a relic of Saint John the Baptist survived. However, an inventory of 1283 shows that the treasury had been recreated by that time. The new collection included works of art brought back to Venice by the Venetians in 1261 when they were expelled from Constantinople as well as gifts from foreign rulers and objects produced locally. Over time, the collection also included precious objects that had originally been deposited as security for loans from the government and then kept as a result of default, as well as items deposited for safety by private individuals and then unclaimed.

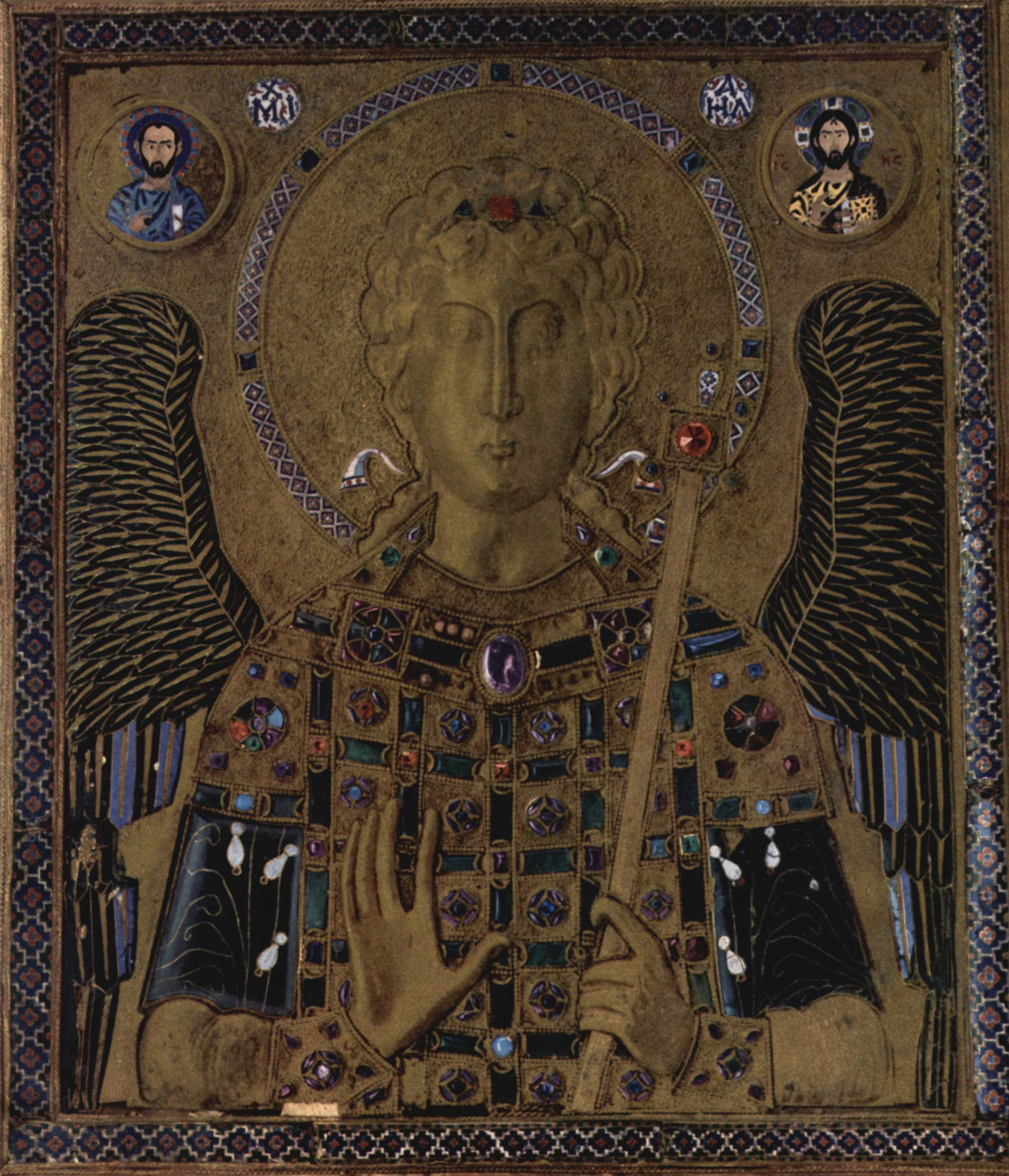
Icon of Saint Michael (late-tenth/early-eleventh century)

The current collection represents only a fraction of the former content of the treasury. After the fall of the Venetian Republic to Napoleon in 1797, the French ordered that all objects in precious metal that were not ordinarily used for religious services were to be deposited in the mint where many were melted down to obtain 535 kilograms of gold and silver. Gold thread was removed from embroidered vestments, and precious gems were pried out of their settings.

In 1798, during the first period of Austrian rule of Venice (1798–1805), the surviving objects were returned to the treasury, and in 1801 five important manuscripts belonging to the basilica were transferred to the Marciana Library. Among these was the Grimani Breviary, the illuminated Flemish breviary that once belonged to Domenico Cardinal Grimani. Periodically, during the second period of French domination (1805–1814) and in the second period of Austrian rule (1814–1866), objects from the treasury had to be sold in order to raise funds to finance necessary repair work on the basilica.

== Collection ==
The Byzantine works of art in metalwork, enamel and hardstone carving constitute the most important part of the treasury. The group of Byzantine hardstone vessels in various semi-precious stones is particularly outstanding. Of note is the sixth-century throne-reliquary, the so-called 'Cathedra of Saint Mark', in rather crudely carved alabaster. It would only fit a bishop with a slight figure, and has a large compartment for relics below the seat. It may have functioned as a "throne-lectern" or resting place for a gospel book, making actual the hetoimasia ("empty throne") images with open books that are found in art of the period.

There are also numerous Islamic works of art held in the collection, including a rare relief-cut turquoise glass bowl. This bowl was made in Iran or Iraq between the 9th and 10th centuries C.E., and is currently mounted in a silver-gilt setting encrusted with jewels and Byzantine enamels. The opaque turquoise glass bowl is adorned with five lobes, each with an image of a running hare enclosed within a panel carved in low relief. The inscription on the bottom of the bowl reads ‘Khurasan’, the region in northeastern Iran where turquoise was mined.

Another exemplary piece of Islamic art held in the collection is a Fatimid rock crystal ewer, one of a small group of similar objects. The ewer is one of the few Fatimid court objects to survive from the period. It is carved and drilled from a single piece of rock-crystal. The pear-shaped body is decorated with a large vegetal motif at the centre, flanked by seated leopards. The leopards are a sign of royalty in the lands of the Near East. There is an inscription encircling the shoulder that reads, "The blessing of God on the Imam al-Aziz bi'llah," bestowing blessings to the Fatimid caliph who ruled from 975 to 996 C.E. The ewer has an elevated rim and a narrow neck, and the handle is topped by a small cowering ibex. The rock crystal ewer was likely looted from the caliph's treasuries in 1067 C.E. and eventually reached Europe, where it a gold mount was added.

== Bibliography ==
- Alcouffe, Daniel, 'Classical, Byzantine and Western hardstone-carving', in David Buckton, ed., The Treasury of San Marco Venice, Metropolitan Museum of Art (Milano: Olivetti, 1984), pp. 73–105
- Frazer, Margaret E., 'Byzantine enamels and goldsmith work', in David Buckton, ed., The Treasury of San Marco Venice, Metropolitan Museum of Art (Milano: Olivetti, 1984), pp. 109–114
- Lorenzetti, Giulio, Venezia e il suo estuario: guida storico-artistico (Venezia: Bestetti & Tumminelli, 1926; repr. Trieste: Lint, 1974-1994) OCLC 878738785
- Perocco, Guido, 'History of the treasury of San Marco', in David Buckton, ed., The Treasury of San Marco Venice, Metropolitan Museum of Art (Milano: Olivetti, 1984), pp. 65–68
- Perocco, Guido, 'Venice and the treasury of San Marco', in David Buckton, ed., The Treasury of San Marco Venice, Metropolitan Museum of Art (Milano: Olivetti, 1984), pp. 5–34
