= Clara J. Peck =

English-born American public health nurse and hospital matron

Clara Jane Thornton Peck (March 1, 1862 – 15 June 1926) was an English-born American public health nurse and hospital matron, based in Greensboro, North Carolina.

== Early life and education ==
Clara Jane Thornton was born at Stroud, Gloucestershire in 1862, one of the five children of John Thornton and Jane Thornton. The Thorntons emigrated in 1872, settling first in Pittsburgh, Pennsylvania, where Clara attended the Pershing Conservatory of Music and was a soloist in her church choir.

== Career ==
In 1898 she moved to Greensboro, North Carolina. In 1901, as a 39-year-old widow, she trained as a nurse at Greensboro Hospital, and showed such aptitude that she was soon the hospital's first matron. By 1909, "Mother Peck" had the experience and reputation to be selected as Greensboro's first district nurse, by the newly formed District Nurse and Relief Association, and paid by a public subscription drive. Every month, she attended hundreds patients in need, usually in their homes, and became a common sight walking between visits. Her experiences in the community gave her a close familiarity with tuberculosis, and insights into possible preventive measures. She became head of a small tuberculosis hospital in town, and in 1923, was a founder of North Carolina's first county-supported sanatorium. She also worked with the local American Red Cross chapter during the 1918 flu pandemic. She was so much a community institution that, when she was knocked unconscious by a hit-and-run driver in 1921, a reward was raised to find the culprit. Said one Greensboro doctor and colleague, "Nurses, like poets, are born, not made, and Mrs. Peck is a shining example of this truth."

== Personal life ==
Thornton married Delbert Stephen Peck in 1883. They had three children; a son died young, and two daughters, Saza and Cora, survived Clara. She was widowed when Delbert Peck died in 1899. Clara Peck died in 1926, age 64.

An elementary school in the Glenwood section of Greensboro has been named for Clara J. Peck since 1929. The county sanatorium Peck helped to found is now the site of the Guilford Technical Community College.
