= Rock crystal vase =

Vase made from rock crystal

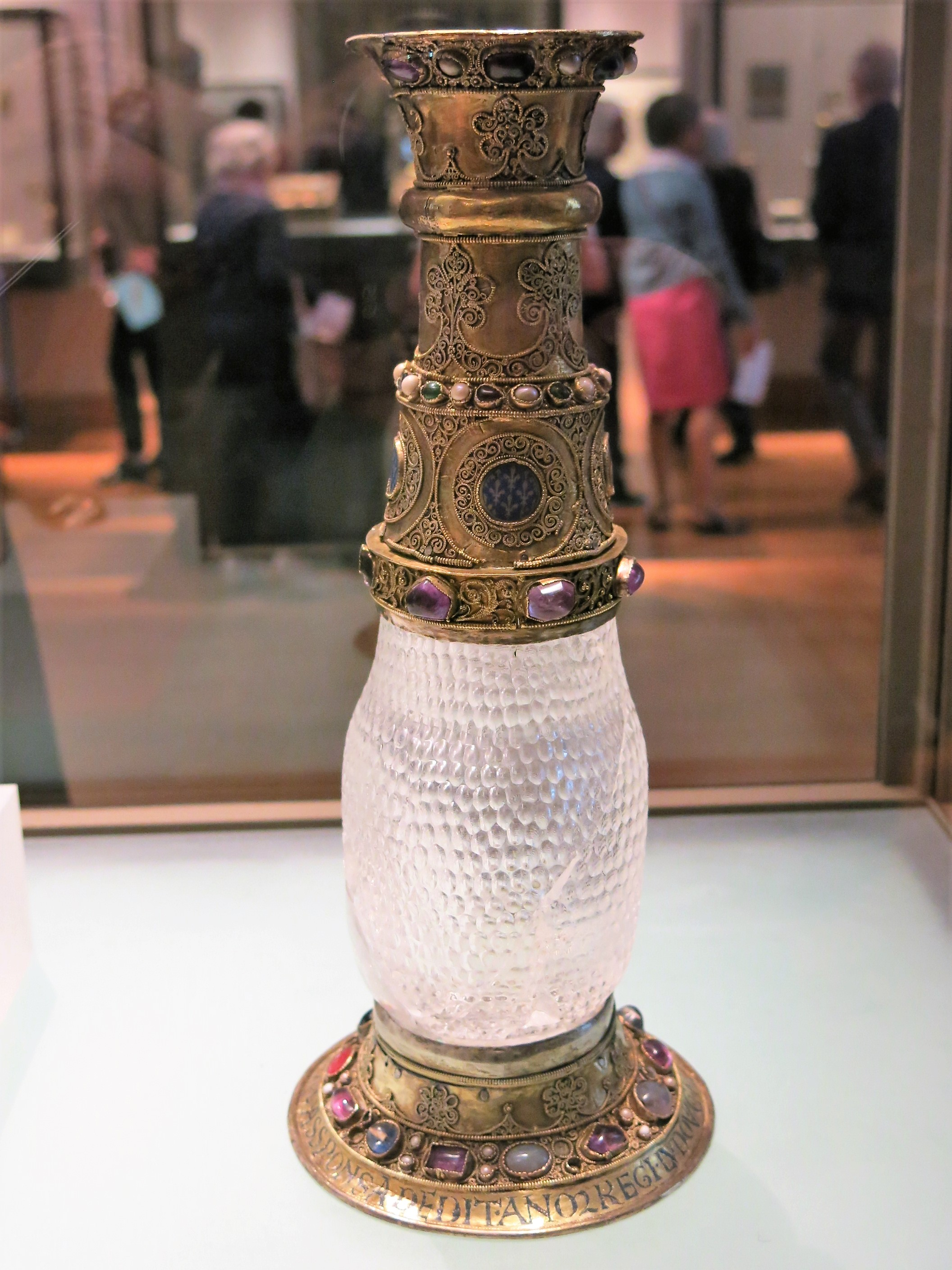
The Eleanor of Aquitaine vase, in the Louvre, Paris.

Vases and ewers made of rock crystal were rare, expensive, and usually decorated with gold and gemstones. They are a type of hardstone carving. They were a specialty of Fatimid art and were often used by royalty in Europe.

== Examples ==
=== Eleanor of Aquitaine's vase ===
A rock crystal vase with honeycomb decoration that probably originated from either the Sassanid (6th–7th century) or post-Sassanid (9th–10th century) period was given to Duke William IX of Aquitaine (the Troubadour) by a Muslim ally (Abd al-Malik Imad ad-Dawla, referred to in Latinised form as Mitadolus on the inscription). When William IX's granddaughter Duchess Eleanor of Aquitaine married King Louis VII of France in 1137, she gave him the rock crystal vase as a wedding present. The inscription finally says that the king gave it to Suger, who in turn offered it to the saints, to be kept at the Abbey of St.-Denis which he had rebuilt. The vase is now in the Louvre in Paris, and is the only artefact of Eleanor's known to exist today.

=== Mary I and Philip II's vase ===
Another was a crystal and gold posset that the Spanish ambassador gave Queen Mary I of England and Philip of Spain as a betrothal gift. It was made by Benvenuto Cellini and the whole set is now on display at Hatfield House in England.
