= Fatimid art =

Art forms from the Fatimid Caliphate (909–1171)

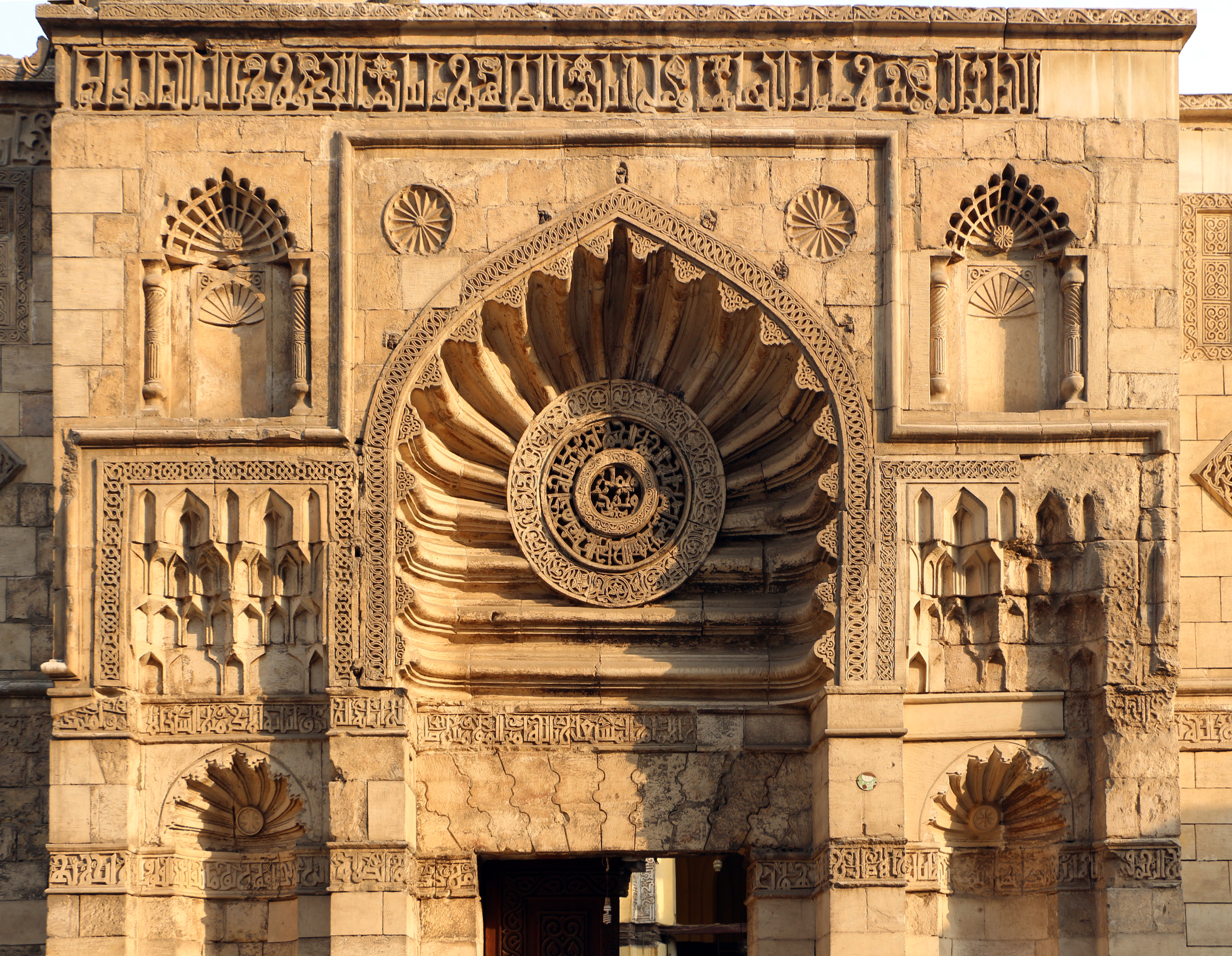
Facade of the Aqmar Mosque in Cairo built in 1125. The central medallion includes the inscriptions of the names of Muhammad and Ali.

Fatimid art refers to artifacts and architecture from the Fatimid Caliphate (909–1171), an empire based in Egypt and North Africa. The Fatimid Caliphate was initially established in the Maghreb, with its roots in a ninth-century Shia Ismailist uprising. Many monuments survive in the Fatimid cities founded in North Africa, starting with Mahdia, on the Tunisian coast, the principal city prior to the conquest of Egypt in 969 and the building of al-Qahira, the "City Victorious", now part of modern-day Cairo. The period was marked by a prosperity among the upper echelons, manifested in the creation of opulent and finely wrought objects in the decorative arts, including carved rock crystal, lustreware and other ceramics, wood and ivory carving, gold jewelry and other metalware, textiles, books and coinage. These items not only reflected personal wealth but were used as gifts to curry favour abroad. The most precious and valuable objects were amassed in the caliphal palaces in al-Qahira. In the 1060s, following several years of drought during which the armies received no payment, the palaces were systematically looted. The libraries were largely destroyed and precious gold objects were melted down, and a few treasures were dispersed across the medieval Christian world. Afterwards, Fatimid artifacts continued to be made in the same style, but were adapted to a larger populace, using less precious materials.

== Architecture ==
In architecture, the Fatimids followed Tulunid techniques and used similar materials, but also developed those of their own. In Cairo, their first congregational mosque was al-Azhar mosque ("the splendid") founded along with the city (969–973), which, together with its adjacent institution of higher learning (al-Azhar University), became the spiritual center for Ismaili Shia. The Mosque of al-Hakim (r. 996–1013), an important example of Fatimid architecture and architectural decoration, played a critical role in Fatimid ceremonial and procession, which emphasized the religious and political role of the Fatimid caliph. Besides elaborate funerary monuments, other surviving Fatimid structures include the Aqmar Mosque (1125) as well as the monumental gates for Cairo's city walls commissioned by the powerful Fatimid emir and vizier Badr al-Jamali (r. 1073–1094).

=== Building inscriptions ===
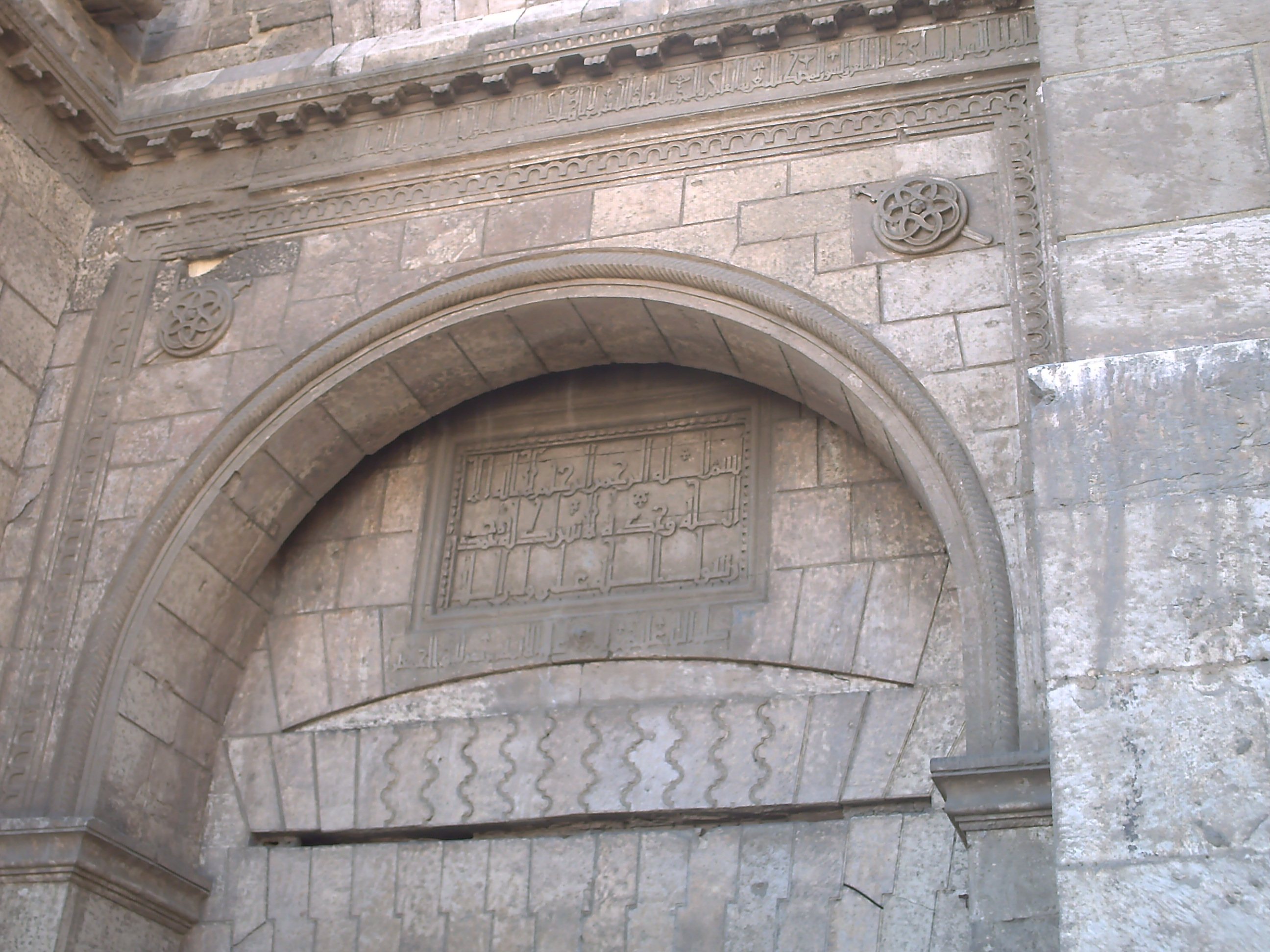
Bab al-Futuh gate in the old city wall of Cairo built by Fatimid vizier Badr al-Jamali in 1087

Illuminated manuscripts and codex books were common in the Fatimid Dynasty, but this was not the only way that text was used. Public text took the form of large inscriptions on the side of outdoor monuments or buildings. For example, inscriptions were added to the Al-Hakim Mosque in 1002-03 CE. In order for pedestrians to read the inscriptions, they were done in a floriated Kufic script style, which was easily legible. In some cases, the inscriptions were meant to establish the legitimacy of the Fatimid dynasty. For example, the Cairo Bab al-Nasr, or Gate of Victory, had the names of Ali and Muhammad, the two religious leaders from which the Fatimid leaders traced their right to rule. These two names were also inscribed on the Aqmar Mosque. In other cases, verses from the Qur’an that mentioned the ahl-bayt, or " the people of the house" were inscribed on public buildings. The phrase ahl-bayt makes a connection to Ali, again emphasizing the legitimacy of rule.

== Manuscripts ==
The prevalence of books within the Fatimid empire was demonstrated by the existence of the Dār al-’Ilm, or the House of Knowledge. In 1045 CE, the Dār al-’Ilm was reported to contain 6,500 volumes of scientific and literary subjects. When the Fatimid Dynasty dissolved during the twelfth century, the libraries and collections of books that existed in Cairo were dispersed, making it difficult to locate any complete manuscripts. Only fragments of text and paper are able to provide information of the content and style of Fatimid manuscripts. It is rare to have an example of both text and illustrations of the same page, which makes it difficult to gather information about illuminated manuscripts. In some cases, it is possible that illustrations were added to an already existing text at a later date. Fatimid illustration style can be demonstrated by one surviving piece of paper, which was excavated in Cairo. This single sheet of paper has drawings on both sides; one side showing a lion, and the other, a hare. While it is unclear whether this page originated in a book, potentially of scientific or zoological subject matter, it is an example of larger patterns of naturalist and figural representation within Fatimid art.

=== Blue Quran ===
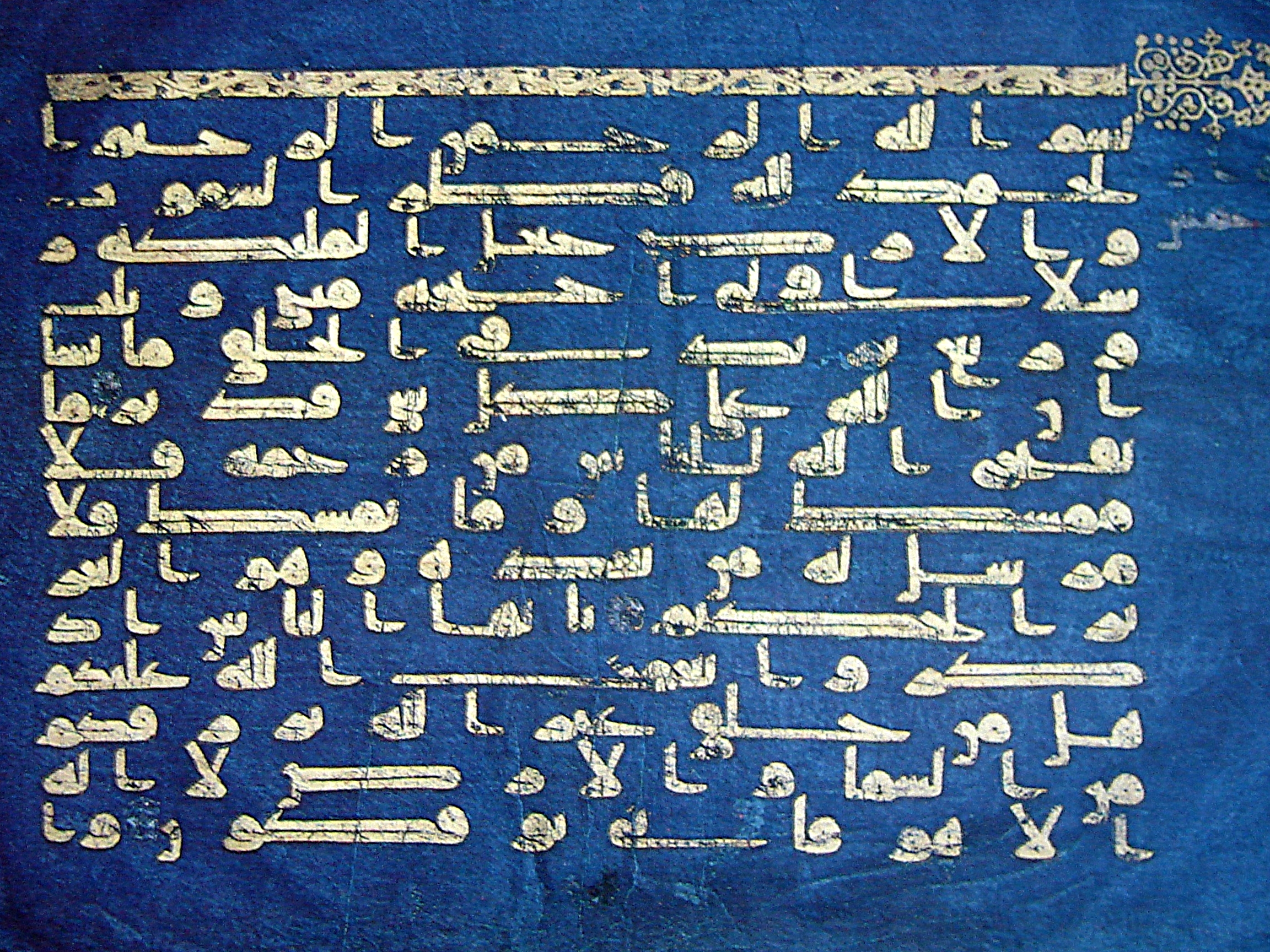
Folio from the Blue Quran, gold and silver leaf on indigo-dyed parchment, at the Raqqada National Museum of Islamic Art

The Fatimid caliphate, ruling Egypt from 969 to 1171, was based in what is today’s Tunisia in the early tenth century. The caliphs were known for their generous patronage of artworks for extravagant ceremonies. Unfortunately, very few manuscripts and buildings survived to explicate the sudden artistic flourish. The only extant architectural monument from the early Fatimid period is a mosque in al-Mahdiyya, Tunisia. Although little is known about Fatimid manuscripts, one of the most recognizable Islamic manuscripts, the Blue Quran, has been attributed by Jonathan Bloom to tenth-century Tunisia under the Fatimid patronage.

The Blue Quran was originally composed of 600 leaves, each measuring 30 cm x 40 cm. Only thirty-seven pages are extant but scattered across the world. Each horizontal indigo parchment leaf is marked by fifteen lines of gold Kufic script that are of the same length; ends of the verses are decorated with silver medallions, besides which there are no additional ornamentations.

The Blue Quran is notable for its intense blue color that has lasted for thousands of years. Most scholars have concluded that the parchment was dyed indigo. Cheryl Porter, an expert in Islamic book conservation, pointed out that dyeing parchment was next to impossible as it would leave the parchment freckled. Through experimentation, Joan Wright, a paper conservator at the Museum of Fine Arts in Boston, was able to recreate an even indigo color of similar shade of the Blue Quran on parchment by simply rubbing the color onto it.

Besides the fantastic color, the gold script is another prominent feature of this book. Alain George of University of Edinburgh claimed that the script had been written with gold powder as an ink pigment, a technique called chrysography. Chrysography was commonly practiced for Christian manuscripts and described in Islamic texts. Later, a microscopic examination by Joan Wright revealed that gold leaf was used instead of gold powder. The calligrapher was more likely to first write the text with a pen charged with transparent adhesive, apply gold leaf, and then brush off the fragments that didn’t stick to the page. Scholars also have noticed that the script is outlined in dark brown ink. Since the dark brown color sometimes partially covers the gold, it is reasonably to assume that outlining is the final step that was possibly used to “neaten” the feathery edges of the gold leaf, and to give the manuscript a more clean and crisp finish.

While the extraordinary color scheme has mesmerized viewers for centuries, its significance remains elusive. The combination of blue and gold would not have been unfamiliar to the artist or the patron of the Blue Quran. Lapis lazuli, a deep-blue semi-precious stone often containing “gold” specks, was mined in Afghanistan and used for Ancient Greek jewelry; the interior of the Dome of the Rock is decorated with gold mosaic inscriptions against dark blue backgrounds. Alain George argued that the contrast of the gold text and the dark blue background had “a resonance of light over darkness.” The Blue Quran, like many other Quranic scripts, was not only read but also probably seen by worshippers in both candlelight and natural light. Thus, light played an important role in understanding the color scheme of the book. The effect of the gold leaf would have been more glimmering in an intense source of light, visually accentuating the power of Allah's words to shine light into darkness.

There is an ongoing debate about the origin and time period of the Blue Quran. Jonathan Bloom placed the production of the book in Tunisia during the early Fatimid period mainly based on the abjad numbering system in the book; whereas Alain George attributed the book to eighth or ninth century Baghdad under the Abbasid Caliphate. George's attribution stemmed from the script style. As plausible as the attributions are, scholars still lack strong evidence to anchor the book's origin and time period.

Fatimid Qur'an manuscript

One example of a manuscript from the Fatimid period is the first volume of a two-part Quranic manuscript. It was copied by al-Husayn ibn Abdallah and is estimated to have been produced in Cairo, Egypt in 1028, made with valuable materials such as gold, color, and ink on paper. The calligraphy is highly decorative and colorful, and has borders with gold geometric and naturalistic designs. In 1062, a connection between Fatimid and Yemeni rulers was made in order to strengthen religious and political power, as well as to gain access trade routes to the Indian Ocean and Red Sea. This manuscript was exchanged in order for the Fatimid Caliph al-Mustansir bi’llah to demonstrate his wealth, and political and religious power to the Yemeni ruler Ali al-Sulayhi. Therefore, the manuscript ended up in Sana’a, Yemen, and most likely stayed there until Yemen was conquered by the Ottomans in the 6th century, when it was taken to Bursa, Turkey. It was placed in the tomb of the Ottoman sultan Murad I, and then was put in the Museum of Islamic Endowments in 1913.

This Qur’anic manuscript represents how trade and political activity led to the dispersion of manuscripts across multiple counties and governments. With this example, it is easier to understand the difficulty of locating Fatimid book materials and why so few remain intact and identifiable.

=== Quran Case ===
A gold Quran case, now housed in the Aga Khan Museum, is placed in 11th-century Egypt under the Fatimid reign. Measuring 4.7 x 3.9 cm, it used to hold a miniature Quran. A loop attached to the upper right side of the case suggests that it was worn by its owner as an accessory and a talisman. The entire case is made of gold. The technique employed is called "rope and grain filigree," which was a common one used for Fatimid jewelry. Filigree is an ornamental work of twisting and bending metal wires ("ropes") into intricate patterns. The combination of gold filigree with beaded granulation ("grain") creates an almost sculptural effect, thus giving the surfaces of the case a three-dimensional quality. The use of gold and elaborate patterns convey the patron's wealth and their utmost worship for the Quran. The Quran case is likely the only of its kind. The scarcity could be due to the fact that gold as a precious metal was often melt and repurposed.

=== Government documents ===
Besides elaborately decorated books, government documents are valuable sources that could offer us profound insight into the polities of Medieval Middle East. There has been a widespread misconception that few extant documents originated from the Middle East before 1500 in comparison to those from Medieval Europe. Scholars have been inclined to characterize the polities of Medieval Middle East either as indifferent or despotic. Both situations would explain the scarcity of official documents as they were unnecessary. Large amount Fatimid documents discovered in the Cairo Geniza challenge this widely accepted yet false notion. Cairo Geniza refers to the attic in the Ben Ezra Synagogue in which the documents were stored. In the geniza collections, 1600 Fatimid state documents have been discovered so far. The largest geniza collection at Cambridge houses more state documents that are yet to be studied. The state documents included petitions to sovereigns, memoranda to high-ranking officials, fiscal records, taxes receipts, accounts, ledgers, and decrees. The comprehensiveness and abundance of the documents allow scholars to re-construct the statecraft of the Fatimid Caliphate that probably situated between the two extreme types of polities - indifference and authoritarianism.

The type of documents that were found in the most abundance at the synagogue is state decrees. Almost all the decrees are fragmentary while other documents are intact. The fragmented decrees were originally long, vertical scrolls (rotuli) with wide spacing between words. The pieces appear to have been be cut deliberately, suggesting that the decrees in the scroll format were not meant to be archived. Most of the Fatimid fragments have Hebrew texts, such as liturgical poetry and Biblical paragraphs written in margins. The juxtaposition of Fatimid decrees and Hebrew script indicates that the documents were most likely to be recycled as scrap papers by cantors working at the synagogue. The original scrolls probably served as not only edicts but also as performative props to impress lower-ranking officials. Once they had accomplished their duties, they were discarded. Due to their performative nature, cantors might have chosen the decree scrolls purposefully for religious performances, such as poetry or Bible recitations.

=== Talismanic scroll ===
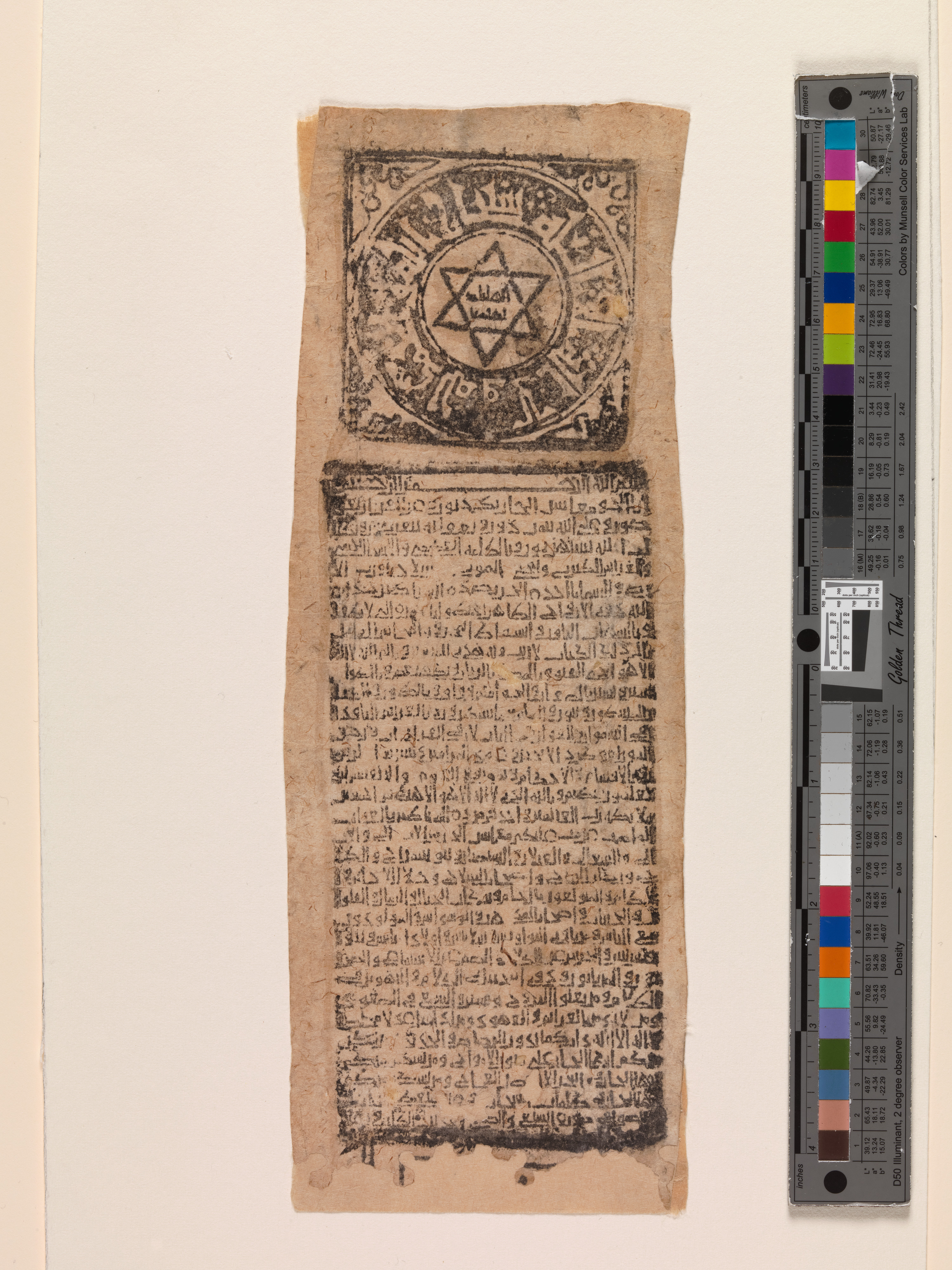
Block-printed Fatimid talismanic scroll, 11th Century, at the Metropolitan Museum of Art

Because examples of manuscripts from the Fatimid period are rare, other examples of writing from the Fatimid period can be used to learn about writing and stylistic techniques. One such example is a talismanic scroll from the 11th century, printed using a block-printing technique tarsh. The symbol on the top of the scroll was known as a “Solomon's Scroll”, or a six-point star. The rest of the scroll was filled with text in a Kufic script that contained Quranic verses, incantations, and prayers. Because these scrolls were a single sheet of paper and not a manuscript, they were kept in amulet boxes. In order to fit in the boxes, they were rolled up and therefore had to be smaller; this particular example is 23 cm tall and 8.4 cm wide. Due to the tarsh technique, these scrolls were monochromatic. Although these scrolls were not manuscripts, they represent devotional literature in the early Islamic world, and were born from a pilgrimage culture of piety and devotion.

== Jewelry ==
The rule of the Fatimid Caliphate (909-1171) stretched across Egypt, North Africa, and beyond, granting the empire control over gold mines that supplied the raw material and wealth to produce luxurious and elaborate jewelry. The jewelry served as a display of personal and imperial wealth and prosperity, worn by men and women alike. The Cairo Geniza, an extensive collection of Hebrew and Arabic documents from the Fatimid era, provides critical information regarding the production and trade of jewelry. The documents establish that jewelry served purposes in society beyond adornment and wealth. For women, it represented financial security in the event of a divorce. In some instances, jewelry served as talismanic protection and contained inscriptions that “imbued the wearer with the essence of baraka (blessings).” The Cairo Geniza mentions many Fatimid pieces of jewelry, including “earrings, pendants, beads, bracelets, anklets, and rings, made of gold, silver, [and] precious stones.”

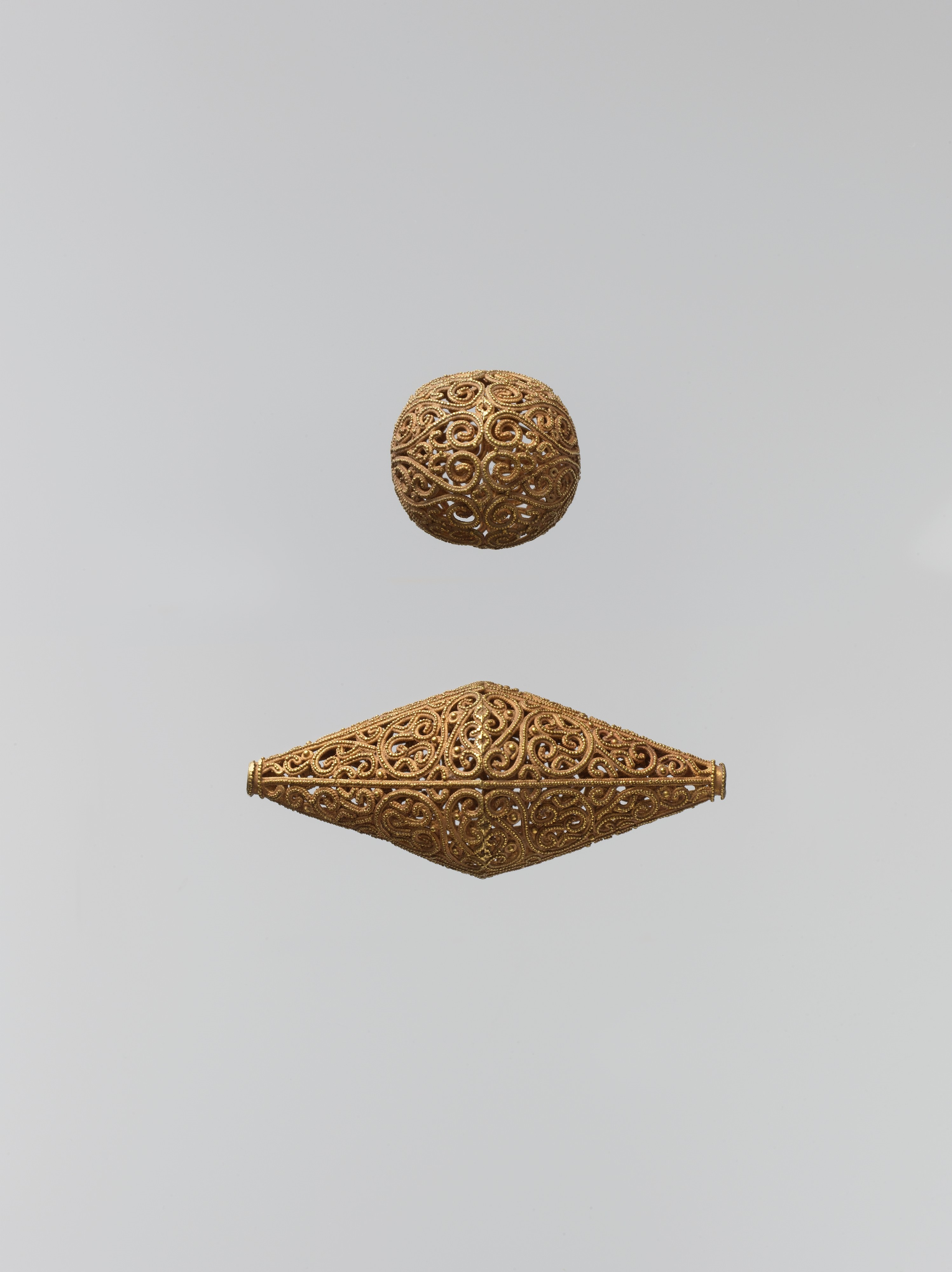
Fatimid gold bead jewelry, at the Metropolitan Museum of Art

Modern knowledge of Fatimid jewelry and metal work is primarily based on findings of 20th-century archaeological excavations in Fustat in modern Cairo. Jonathan Bloom, Islamic art historian, states that the excavated jewelry is only the “faintest impression of the splendid works made by court goldsmiths.” In Tunisia in the 1930s, a hoard of jewelry was discovered, revealing examples from the Fatimid era that, when compared to other locations around the Mediterranean, present a “microcosm of fashions borrowed from other regions.” Accounts from the Cairo Geniza also reveal that women in Fatimid Cairo appreciated fashions from several regions in the surrounding area, especially bracelet and anklet styles. Still, Dr. Marilyn Jenkins-Madina, Curator Emerita of the Department of Islamic Art at The Met Museum writes that Fatimid jewelry remains “one of the few groups of Islamic jewelry that can be placed in a firm historical context,” thanks in part to the Cairo Geniza documents and to artifacts found with Fatimid coins dated and inscribed with the names of caliphs that have helped establish chronology.

The main center of Fatimid Jewelry production is believed to have been Egypt, with gold mined primarily from Upper Egypt and Sub-Saharan Africa. Although artifacts have been found across the lands of the empire, throughout time, jewelry made of precious metals was melted down and repurposed, and thus, a small fraction of the splendor of Fatimid jewelry remains.

=== Characteristics ===
Fatimid Jewelry is primarily characterized by the following elements: box-like construction, open-work surface with strip support, gold loops, S-curves, single or paired twisted wire filigree, crescent shapes, granulation, and arabesque motifs.

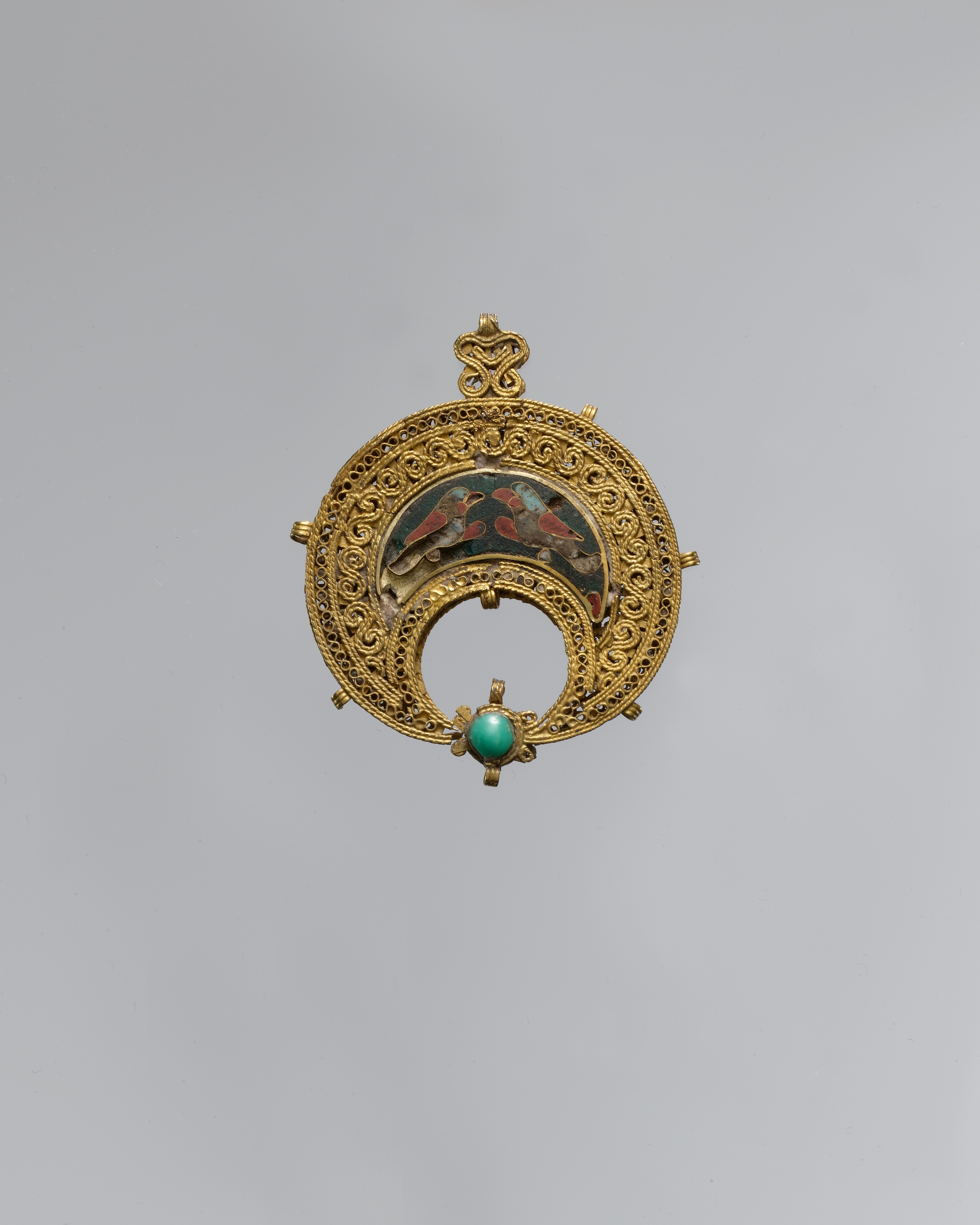
Crescent-shaped pendant depicting birds, at the Metropolitan Museum of Art

The use of fine gold filigree work and granulation are the most identifiable elements of Fatimid Jewelry, often used together. By the mid-11th century, the use of granulation, or the mounting of gold spherical grains on fine gold wire, became less popular in favor of filigree, the shaping of plain and twisted wire into delicate configurations.

Fatimid filigree designs were typically composed of “foliate arabesques of doubled twisted wire filling various shaped compartments” with gold support strips or fine granulation strategically placed underneath, creating an effect of greater weight. Gold wires bent into S-curves were characteristic of this time period, as was open-work gold jewelry, designed and formed of twisted wires supported by arrangements of folded strips.

Box-like construction, where sides are created separately and then joined together, leaving the interior hollow, was used particularly in earrings and pendants, often supporting stones and pearls. Enamel inlays, potentially inspired by Byzantine art, were also utilized in similar pieces, with animal motifs of birds, peacocks, and roosters. An example of one of the few works with enamel to have survived from this period is a pendant kept at the Metropolitan Museum of Art. The pendant utilizes typical elements of Fatimid jewelry, box-like construction, open work design, gold stringing loops, S-shaped filler elements, and twisted wire.

=== Influence ===
Characteristics representative of Fatimid jewelry influenced later Islamic dynasties in Egypt, North Africa, and Spain. Nasrid jewelry in particular includes examples displaying strong inspiration from Fatimid models, potentially through connections with early Spanish Islamic Jewelry and the Mamluk dynasty.

The popularity of Fatimid elements across empires may be an “example of styles emanating from a major fashion center to more provincial areas” in the medieval Islamic world.

== Rock crystal ==
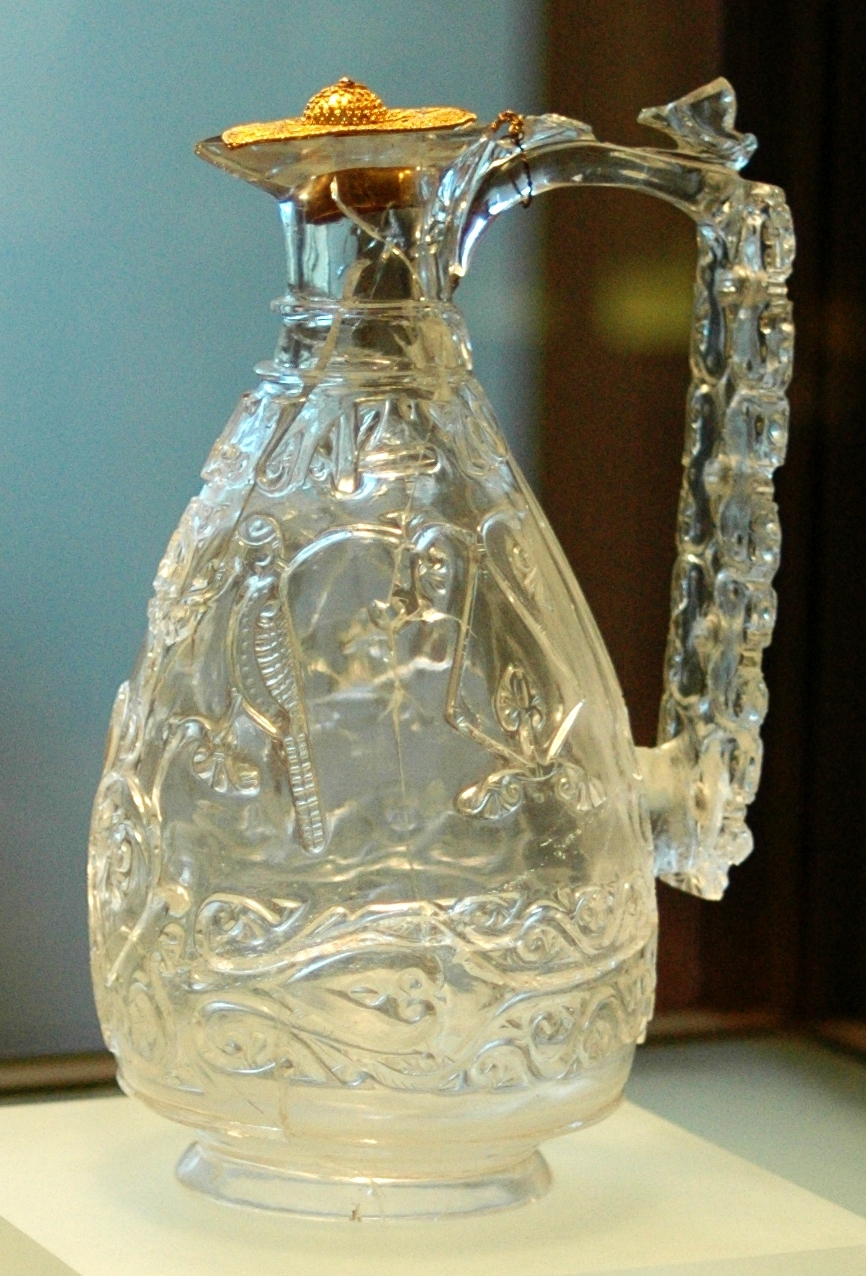
Rock crystal ewer from treasury of St. Denis' Abbey with gold filigree lid, now at the Louvre

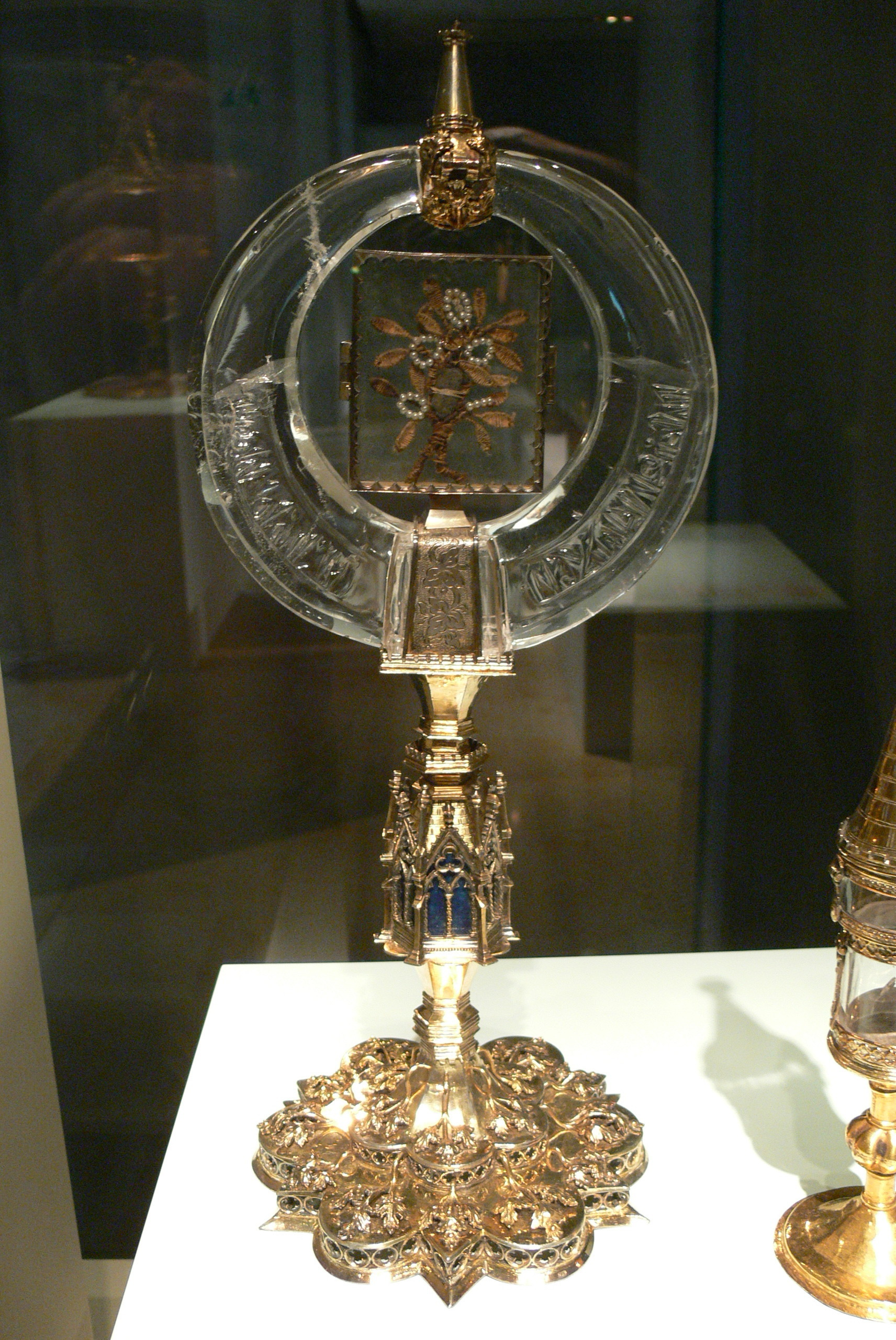
Early 11th century rock crystal crescent inscribed to Caliph al-Zahir, 14th century gold mounting, Germanisches Nationalmuseum

Rock crystal ewers are pitchers carved from a single block of rock crystal. They were made by Islamic Fatimid artisans and are considered to be amongst the rarest objects in Islamic art. There are few that have survived, and are now in collections across Europe. They are often in cathedral treasuries, where they were rededicated after being captured from their original Islamic settings. Made in Egypt in the late 10th century, the ewer pictured is exquisitely decorated with fantastic birds, beasts and twisting tendrils. The treasure of Caliph Mustansir at Cairo, which was destroyed in 1062, apparently contained 1800 rock crystal vessels. Great skill was required to hollow out the raw rock crystal without breaking it and to carve the delicate, often very shallow, decoration.

The Fatimids produced a variety of beautifully crafted works of art resulting in textiles, ceramics, woodwork, jewelry, and importantly, rock crystals. Rock crystal is made up of pure quartz crystal and was shaped by skillful craftsmen whom the Fatimids valued greatly. Of all the rock crystal objects manufactured by Fatimid artisans, the Fatimid rock crystal ewers are considered among the rarest and most valuable objects in the entire sphere of Islamic art. "Only five were known to exist before the extraordinary appearance of an ewer in a provincial British auction in 2008 which was later sold at Christie’s last October. It was the first time one has ever known to have appeared at auction. The last one to surface on the market was purchased by the Victoria and Albert Museum in 1862.” The treasury of the Basilica of San Marco in Venice has two ewers. An additional rock crystal ewer was found in the treasury of Abbey of Saint-Denis in Paris. It was a gift from King Roger II of Sicily to Count Theobald IV of Blois on the occasion of the marriage of the latter's daughter, Isabelle, to the former's son, Roger III, around 1140. Theobald later gave it to Abbot Suger.

“The extant rock crystal objects with no identifying inscription on them appear to be types of containers, either goblets for drinking or ewers and basins for holding liquids, perhaps for washing the hands of the guests after a meal." Over the centuries, many magical properties or benefits were deemed to be associated with objects made using rock crystal.

Between the tenth and eleventh centuries, Egypt produced most of the rock crystals that were located in the medieval treasuries of the West. Several smaller pieces were discovered in Spain that reached the peninsula during the Caliphate of Cordoba. The required way to create rock crystals is to hollow out a piece of crystal without damaging the shape required. Once the objects are ready to be decorated, the carvings usually depict floral or animal themes, especially birds and lions. The settings often use gold or precious stones. Rock crystal vessels often have ha pear-shaped body, beaked rim, and a handle, which originally had a vertical thumb piece that connected the rim of the ewer to the lower part of the body. The designs on the ewer go around the neck and down the body and onto its handle. "All of the details are drilled and cut with great skill, including the texturing in the form of lines and dots covering the bird and animal and the leaves of the arabesque patterns."

Two rock crystal lamps, the first in Saint Petersburg and the other in San Marco in Venice are the last two remaining medieval Islamic rock crystal ewers. “The two lamps have a form very different from the common Islamic globular vase-like lamp. This unusual shape can be explained in part by the material from which they were made: the high price of rock crystal and the proficiency required of the carver meant that the manufacture of these precious objects was only patronized by royalty or nobility.” The lamp from Saint Petersburg goes back to the boat-shaped early Christian metal lamps. The San Marco lamp is a rare ewer and may appear in medieval Islamic manuscript illustrations. Our knowledge of contemporary Fatimid glass is equally-if not more- problematic. "Several extraordinary relief-cut or cameo glass ewers are so similar in size, shape, and decoration to the crystal ewers that some scholars have attributed them to Fatimid Egypt.” Rock crystals are designed to emulate metal vessels of pre-Islamic and early Islamic era.

Ultimately, rock crystals during the Fatimid period display decorative arts. Many rock crystals and their carvers have shown immense skill in their work, treasured by caliphs. The tradition of carving rock crystal in Egypt was masterful; the purest crystals were imported from Arabia and Basra, and the islands of Zanj in East Africa. Nasir-i-Khusraw, a Persian poet and philosopher, states, "Yemen was a source of pure rock crystal, and that prior to discovering this source, lesser quality rock crystal was imported from the Maghreb and India.” Rock crystals have provided valuable insight into the advancement of traditional crafts that are being presented today.

== Gallery ==
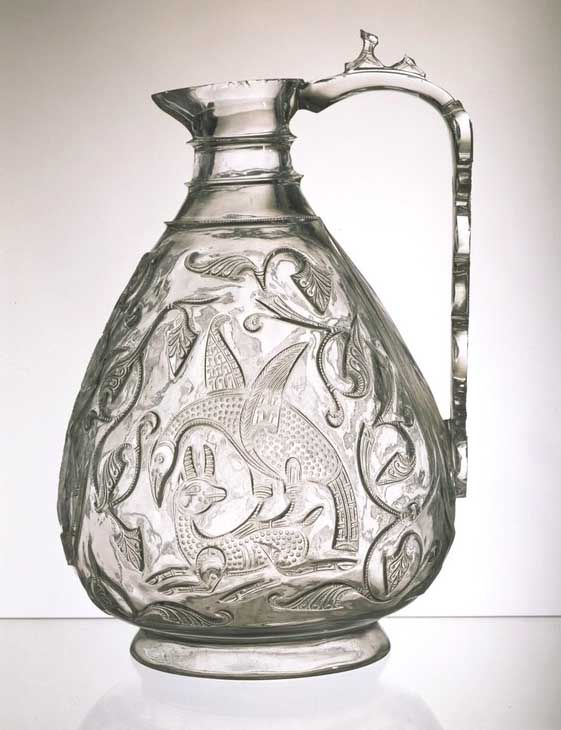
Rock crystal ewer, 7904-1862 Victoria and Albert Museum

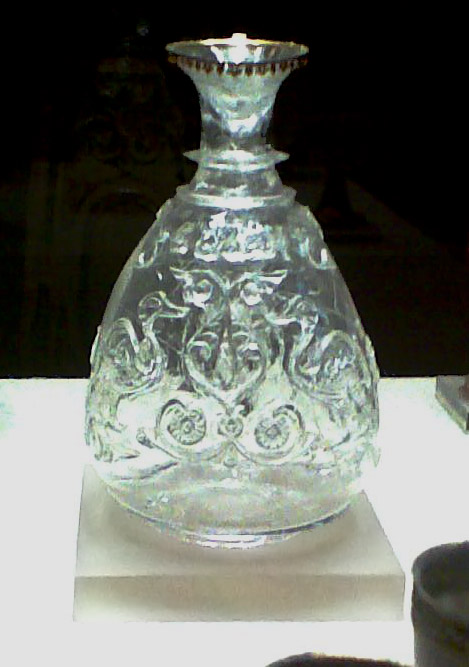
Rock crystal ewer from the treasury of Lorenzo de Medici, Palazzo Pitti

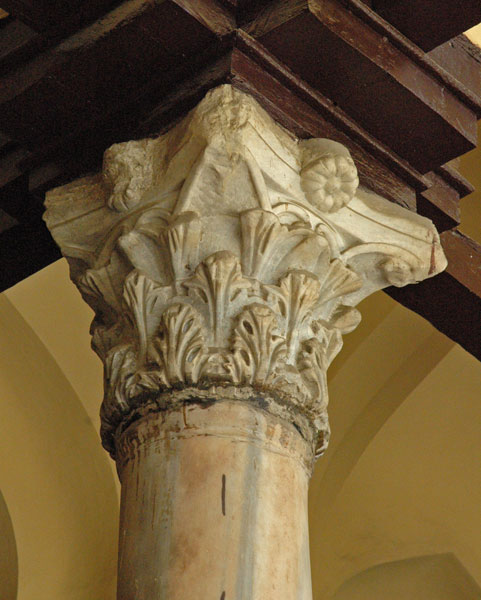
Carved stone column in the al-Aqmar Mosque in Cairo

Mihrab of the Fatimid ruler al-Mustansir Billah and his vizier al-Afdal dated 1094 in the Mosque of Ibn Tulun

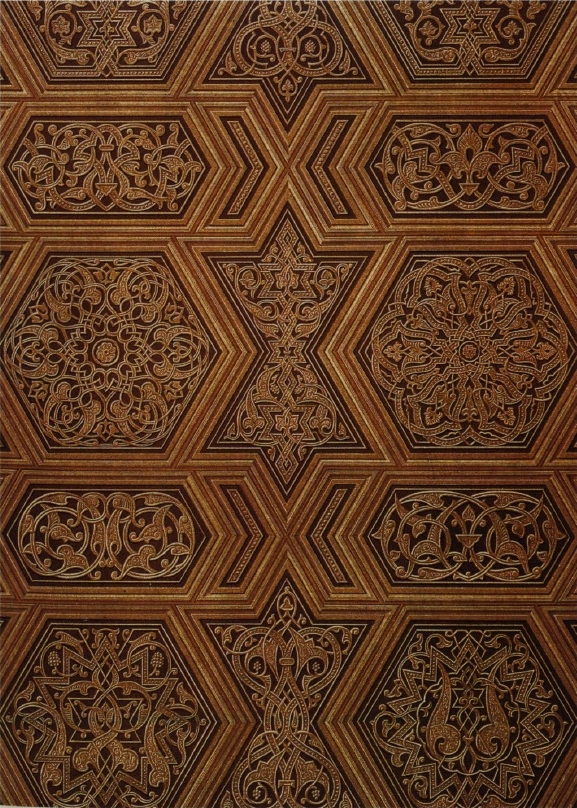
12th century wood carving on the minbar at Qus, lithograph by Émile Prisse d'Avennes

The 12th century minbar of Al-Omari Mosque at Qus

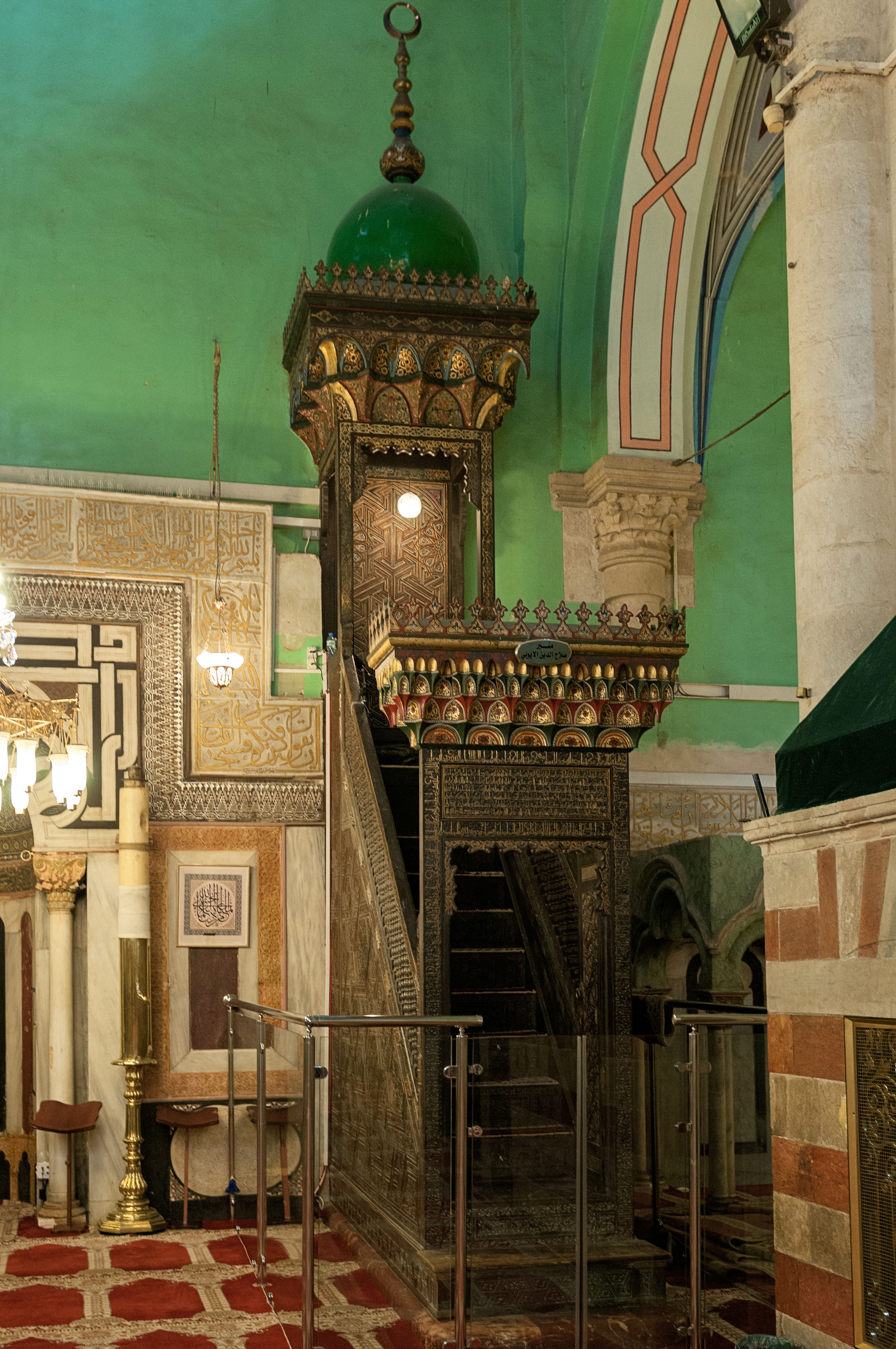
The Minbar of the Ibrahimi Mosque in Hebron, originally commissioned by the Fatimid vizier Badr al-Jamali in 1091 for the shrine of Husayn in Ascalon

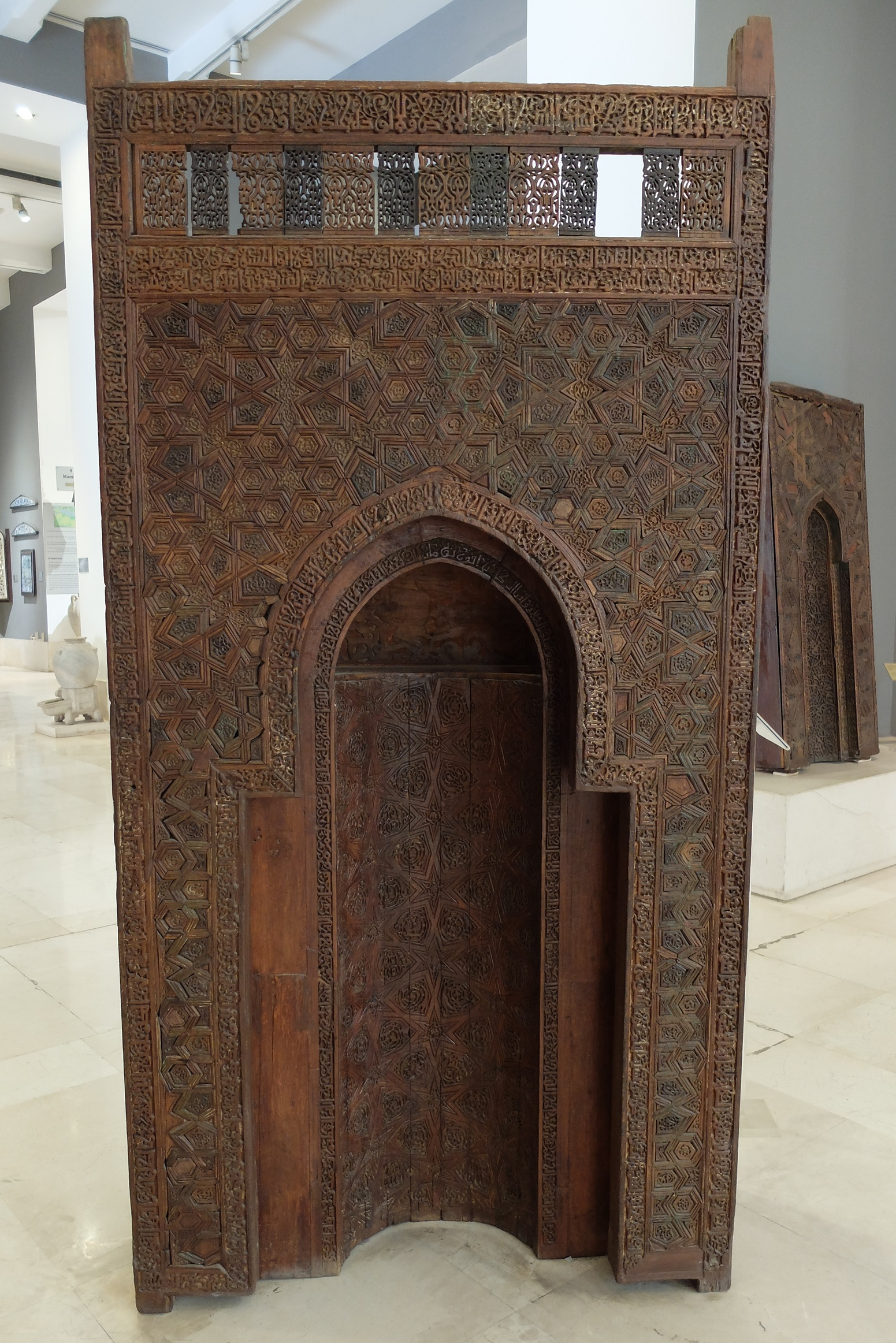
Wooden portable mihrab from the Mashhad of Sayyida Ruqayya, 1154-1160, Museum of Islamic Art, Cairo

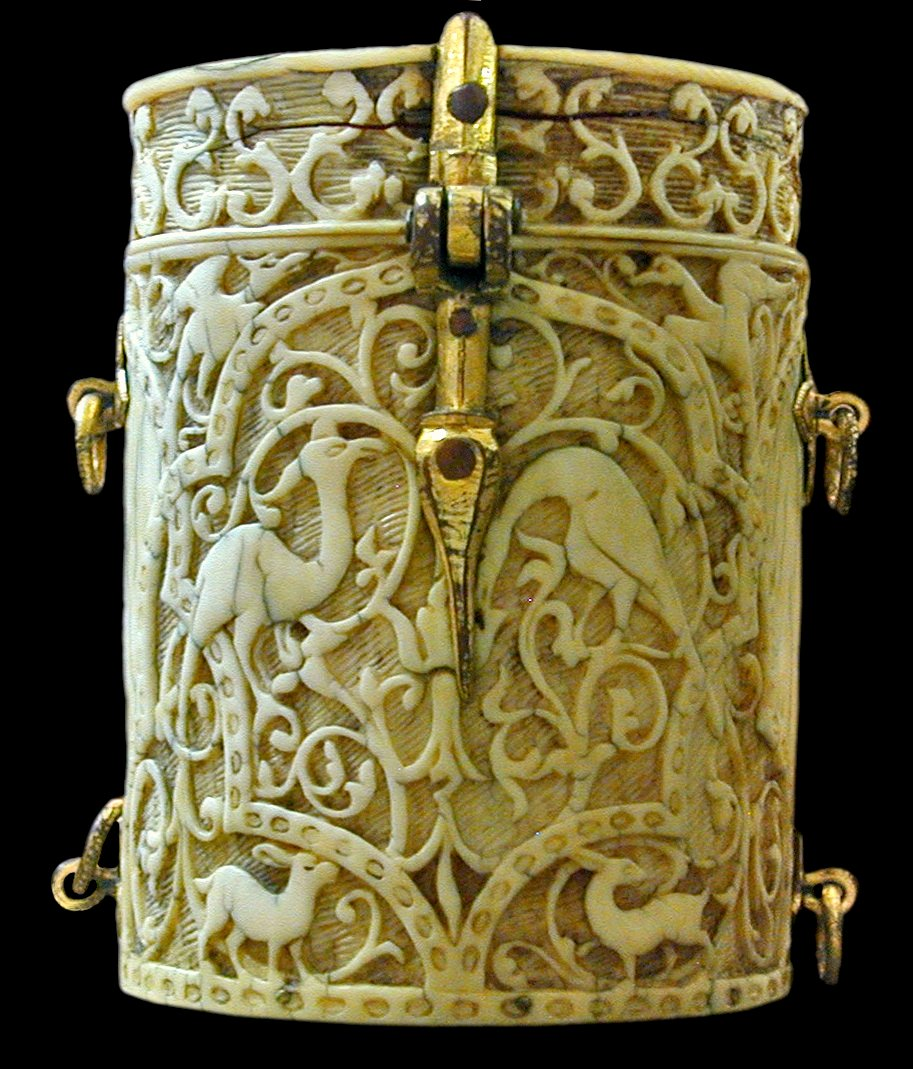
Cylindrical Ivory Box, 11th or 12th century, Museum of Islamic Art, Cairo

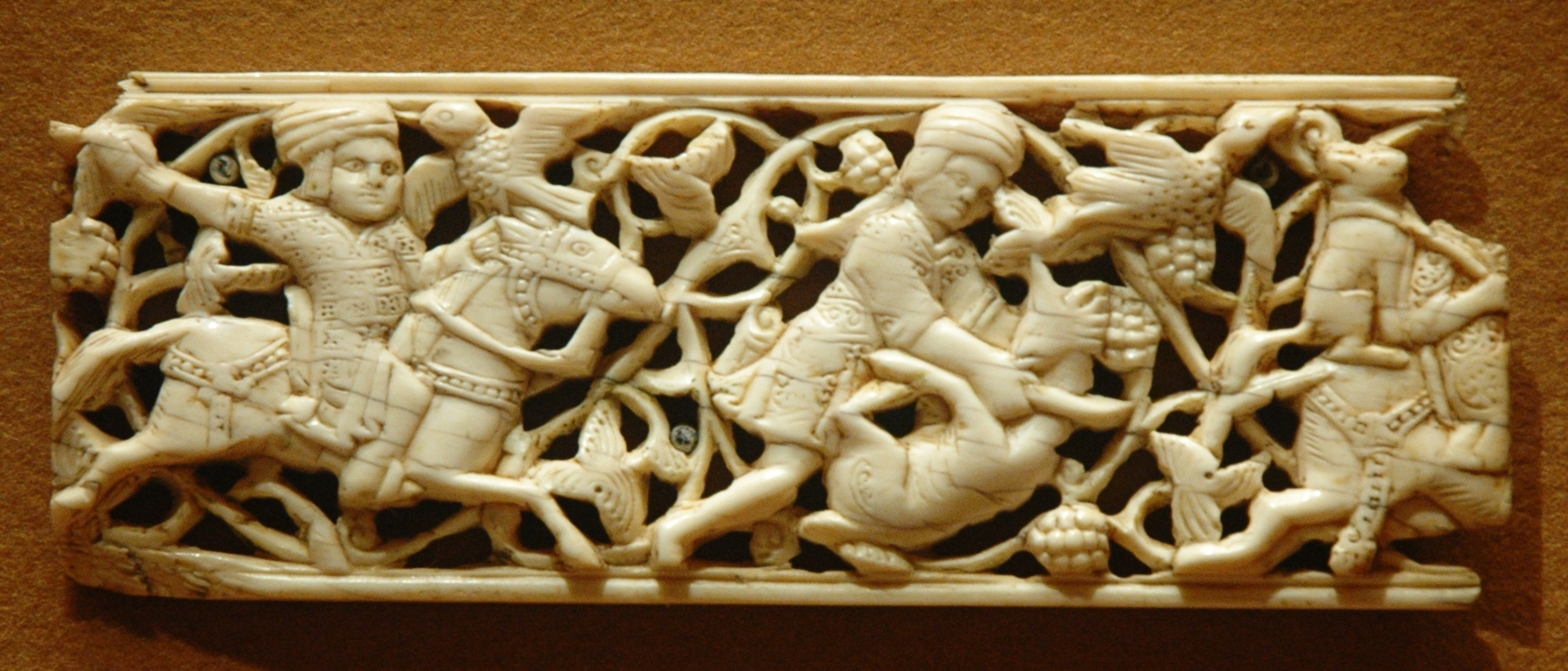
Carved and engraved ivory panel with hunters, Louvre

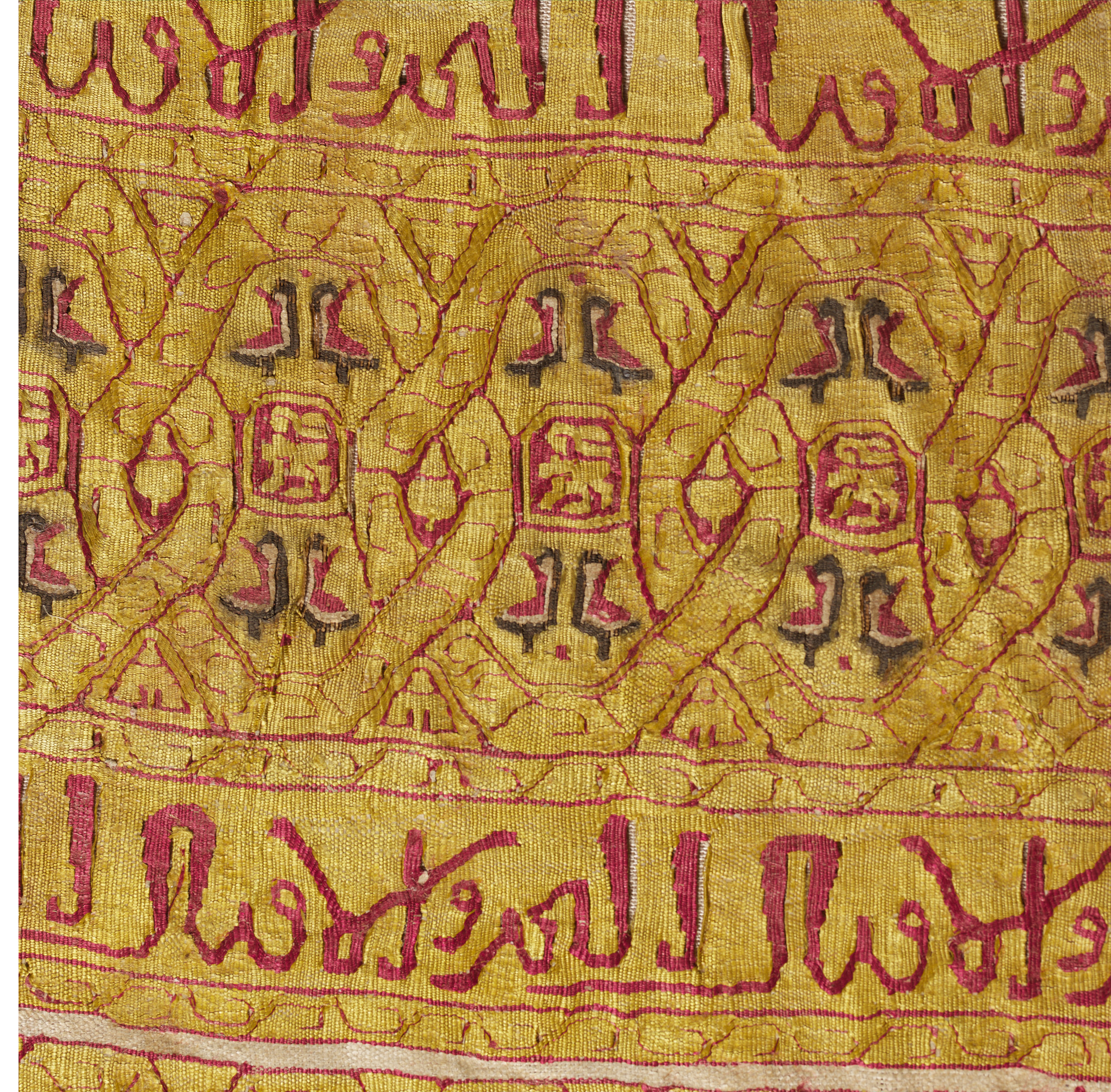
12th century linen tapestry with silk embroidery, Royal Ontario Museum

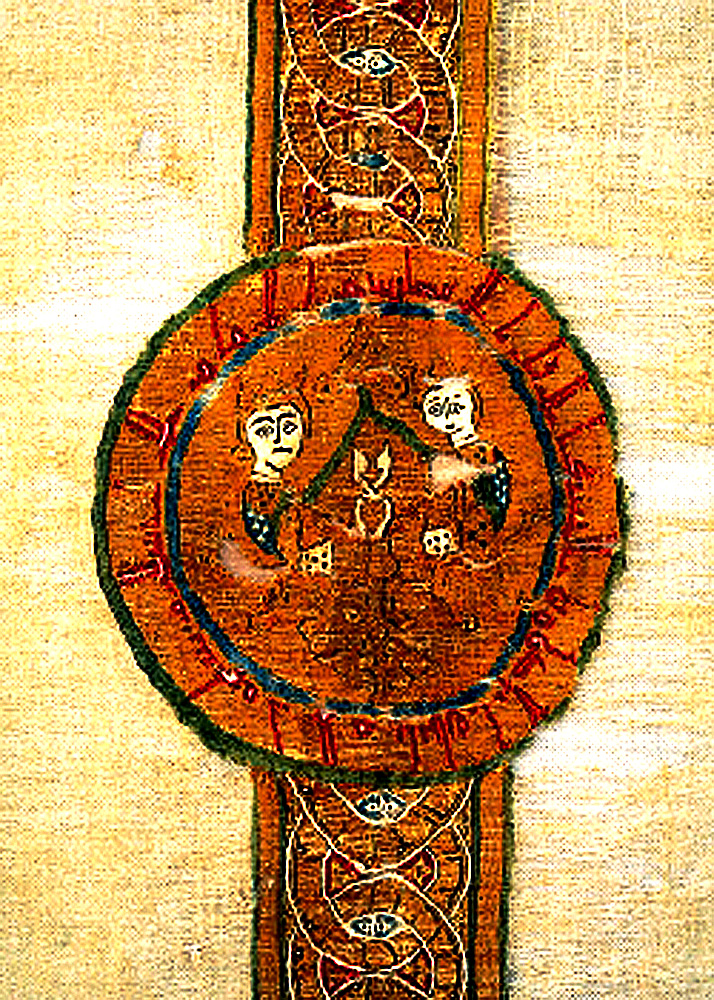
So-called "Veil of St. Anne", 1096/97, Apt, Vaucluse

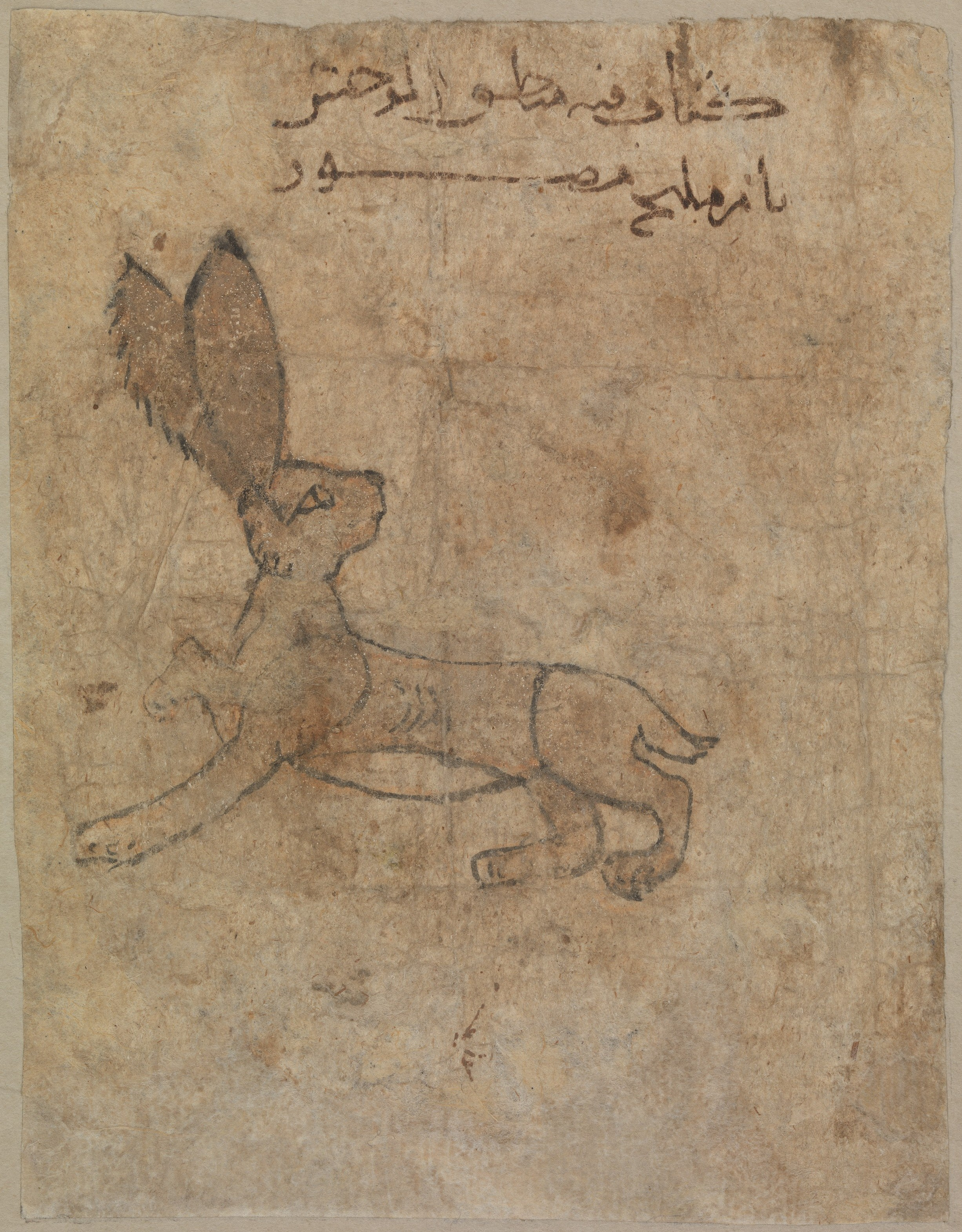
11th-12th century illustration of hare from lost bestiary, Fustat, Metropolitan Museum of Art

12th-13th century copy of 11th century world map from "Book of Curiosities", Bodleian Library

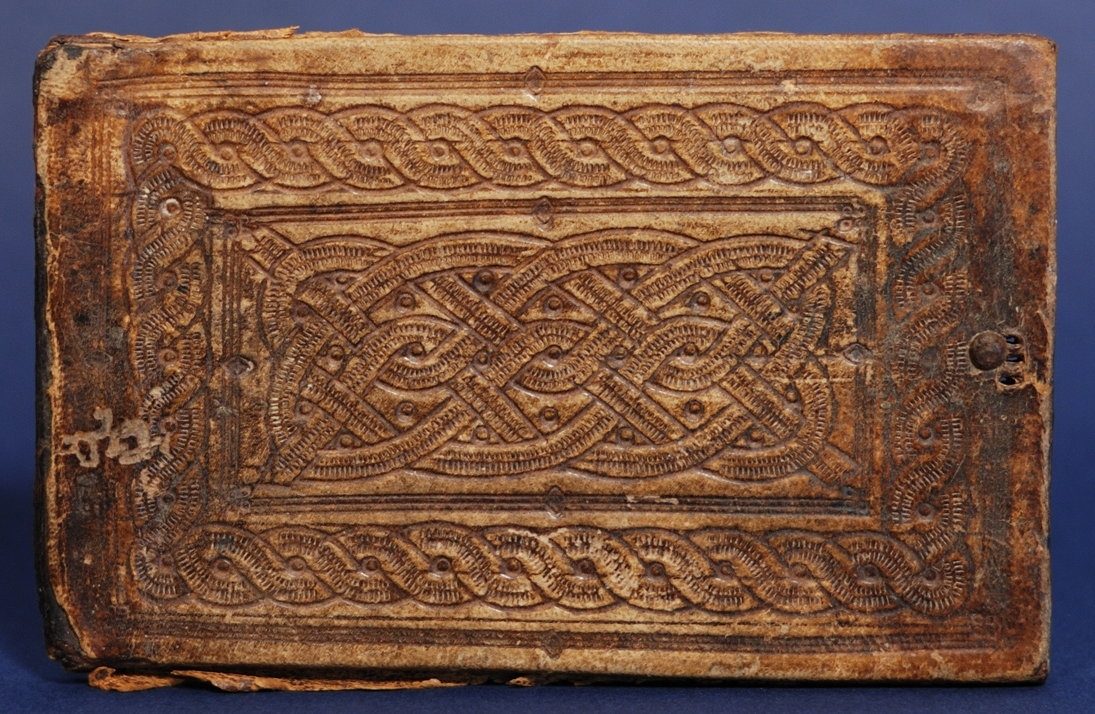
10th century leather bookbinding, Kairouan, Raqqada National Museum of Islamic Art

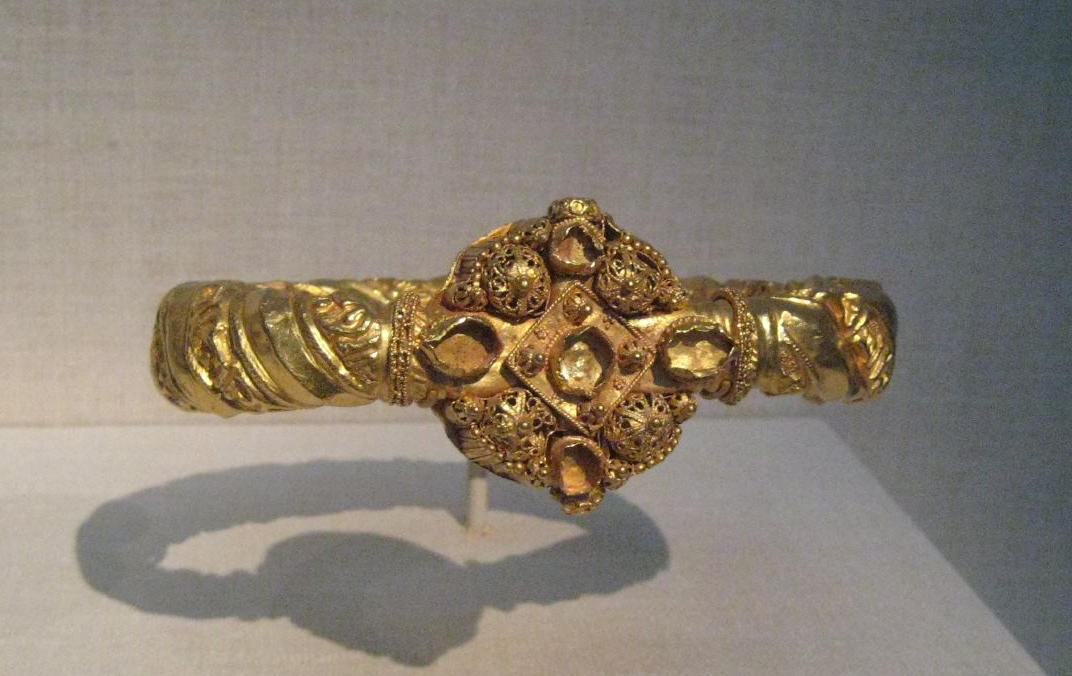
11th century gold armlet from Syria, F1948.25, Freer Gallery of Art

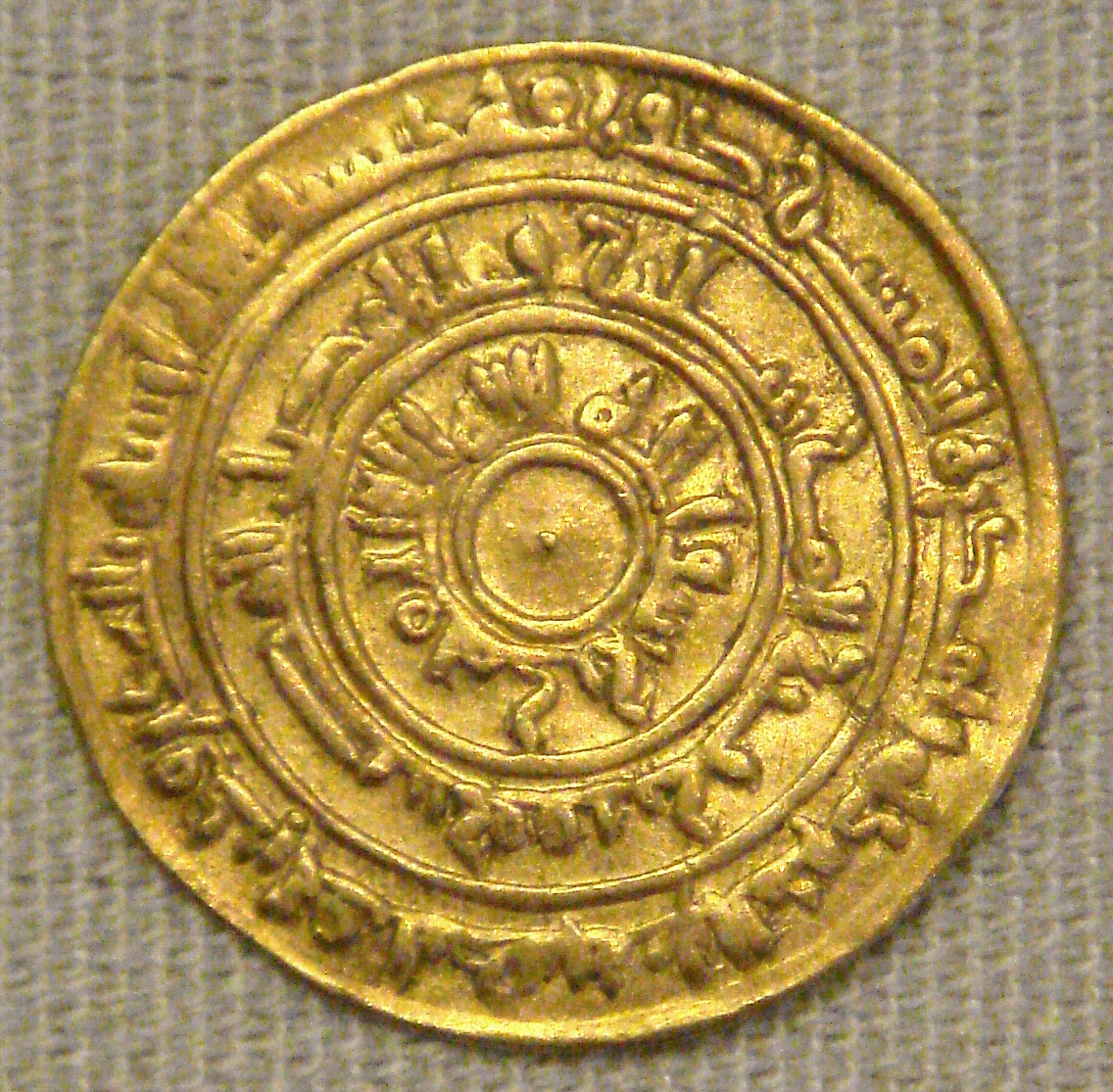
10th century gold dinar, Caliphate of al-Muizz Lideenillah, British Museum

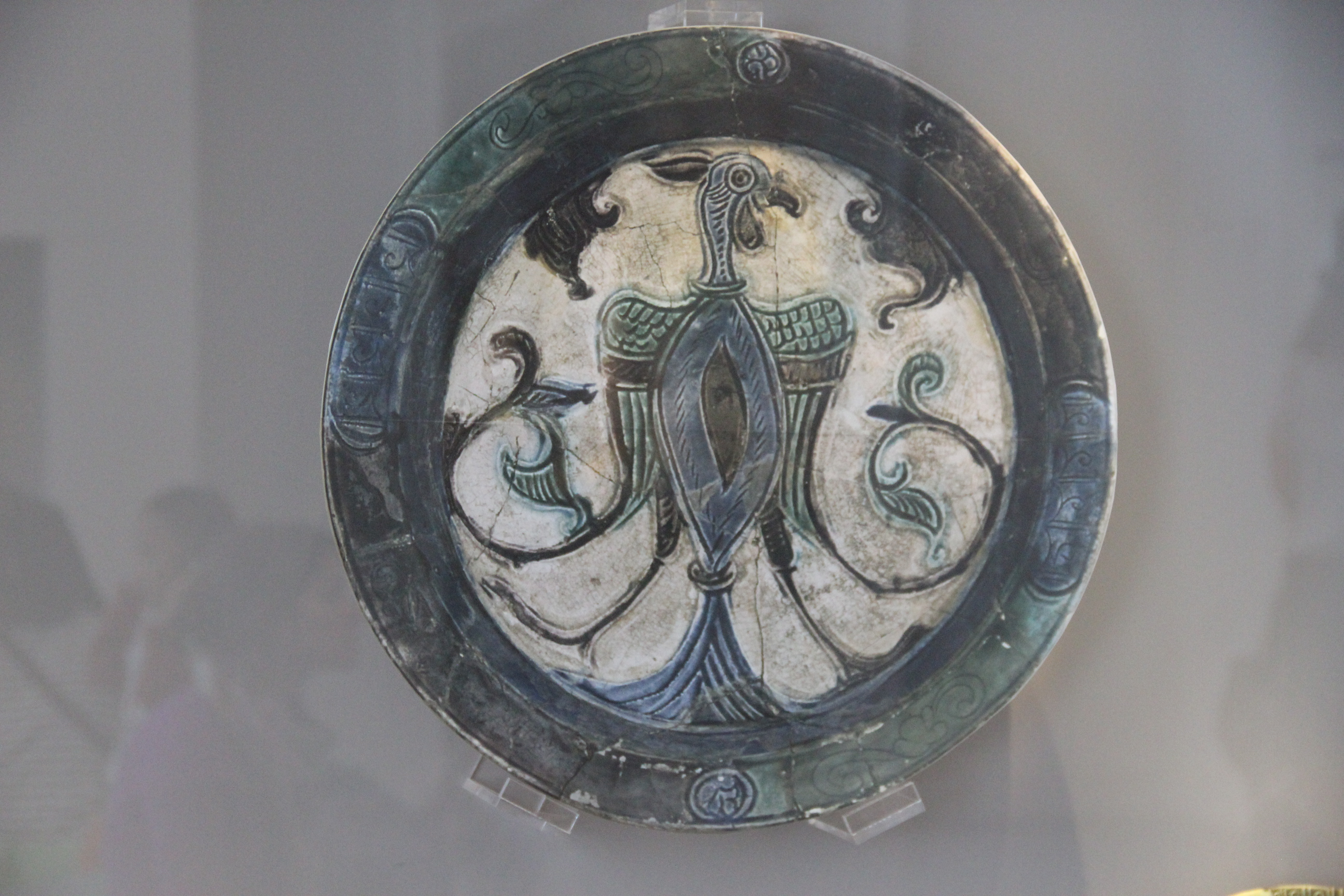
Carved and glazed composite-bodied (lakabi) dish. Museum of Islamic Art, Berlin

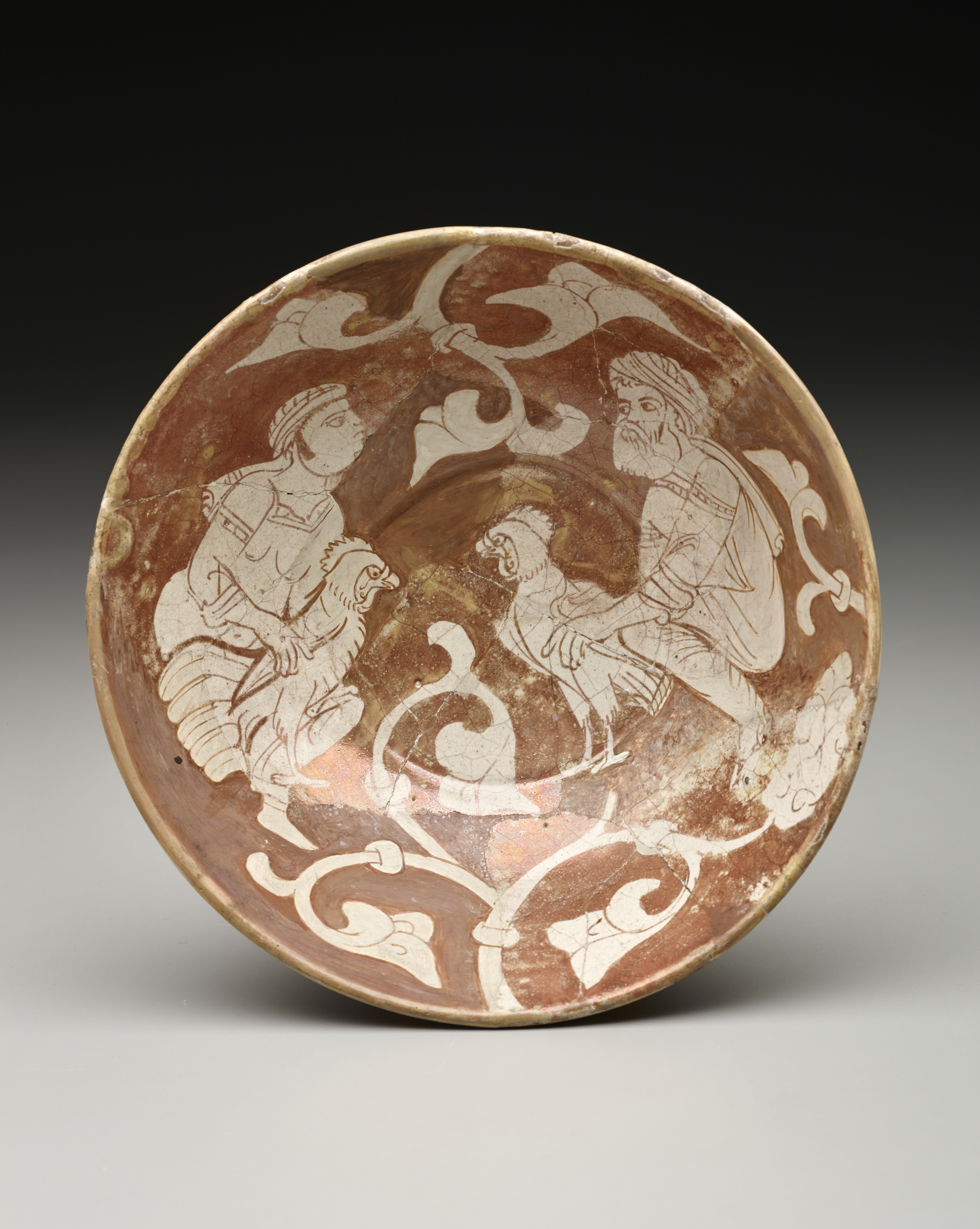
Luster Plate with Cock Fight. Cairo, 11th-12th century. Keir Collection of Islamic Art

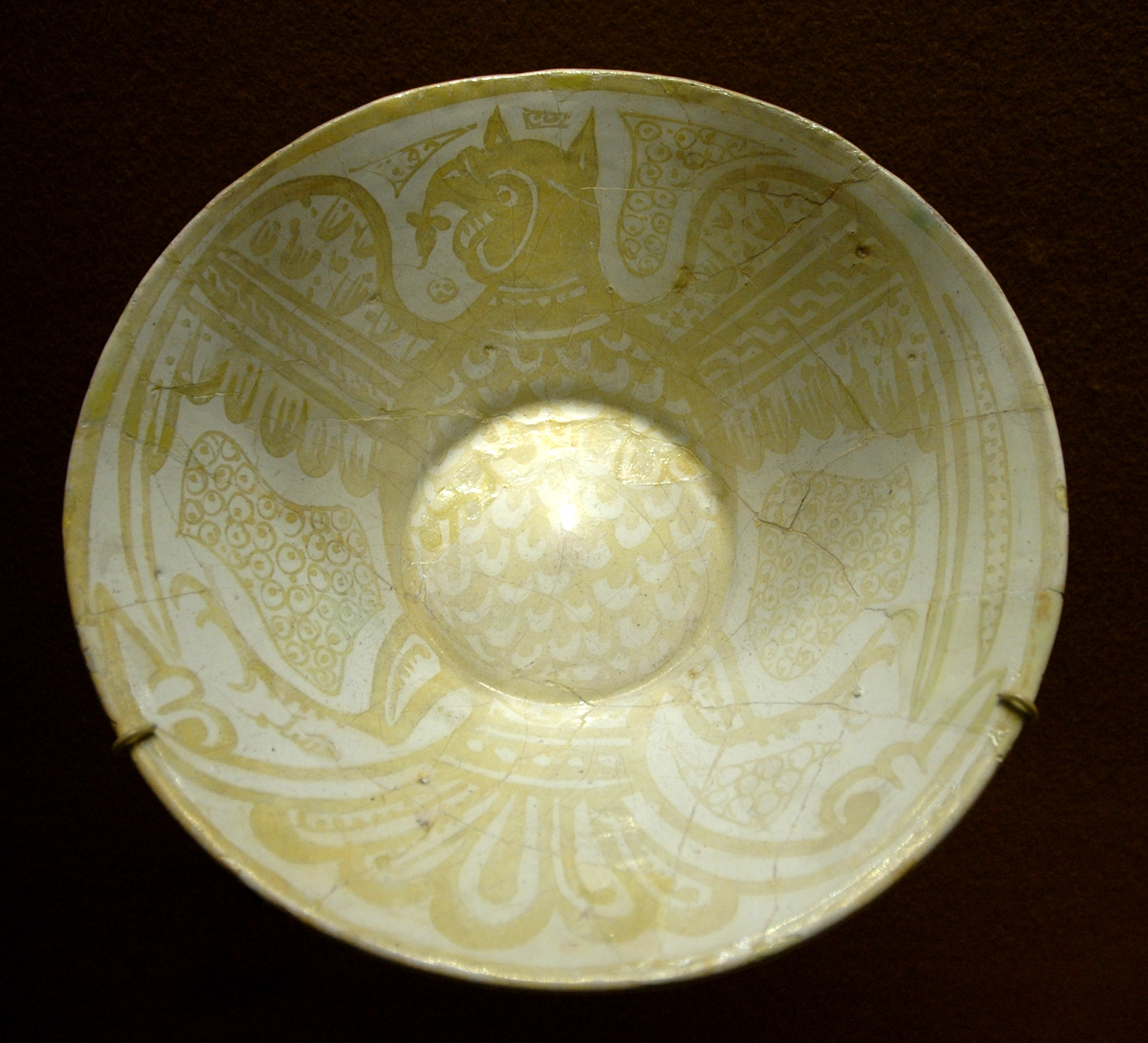
Lustre ware cup with eagle. Metropolitan Museum of Art

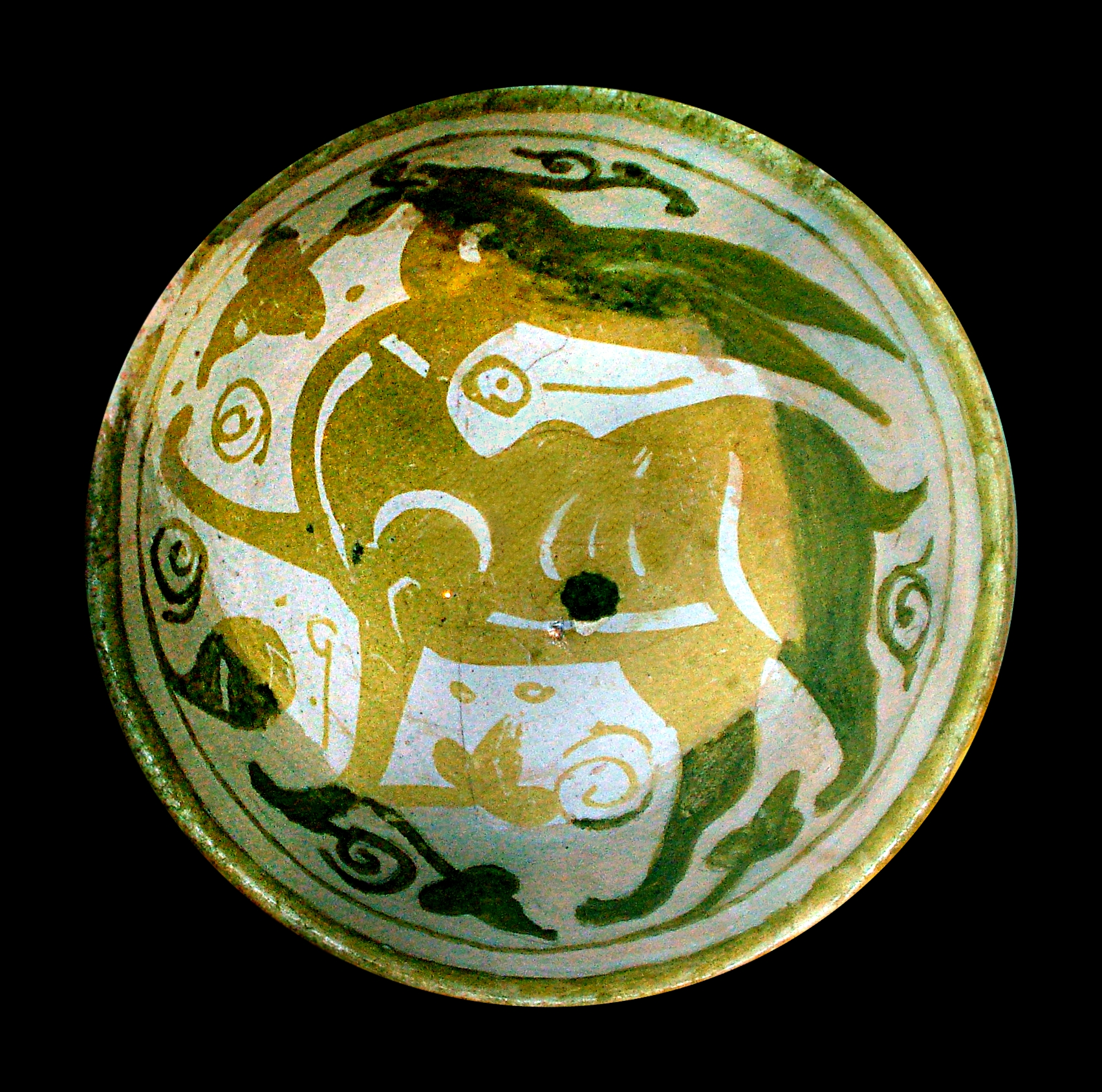
Ceramic bowl, Bardo National Museum
