= Vallérysthal =

French glass works company

Coordinates: 48.6772007°N 7.1284792°E

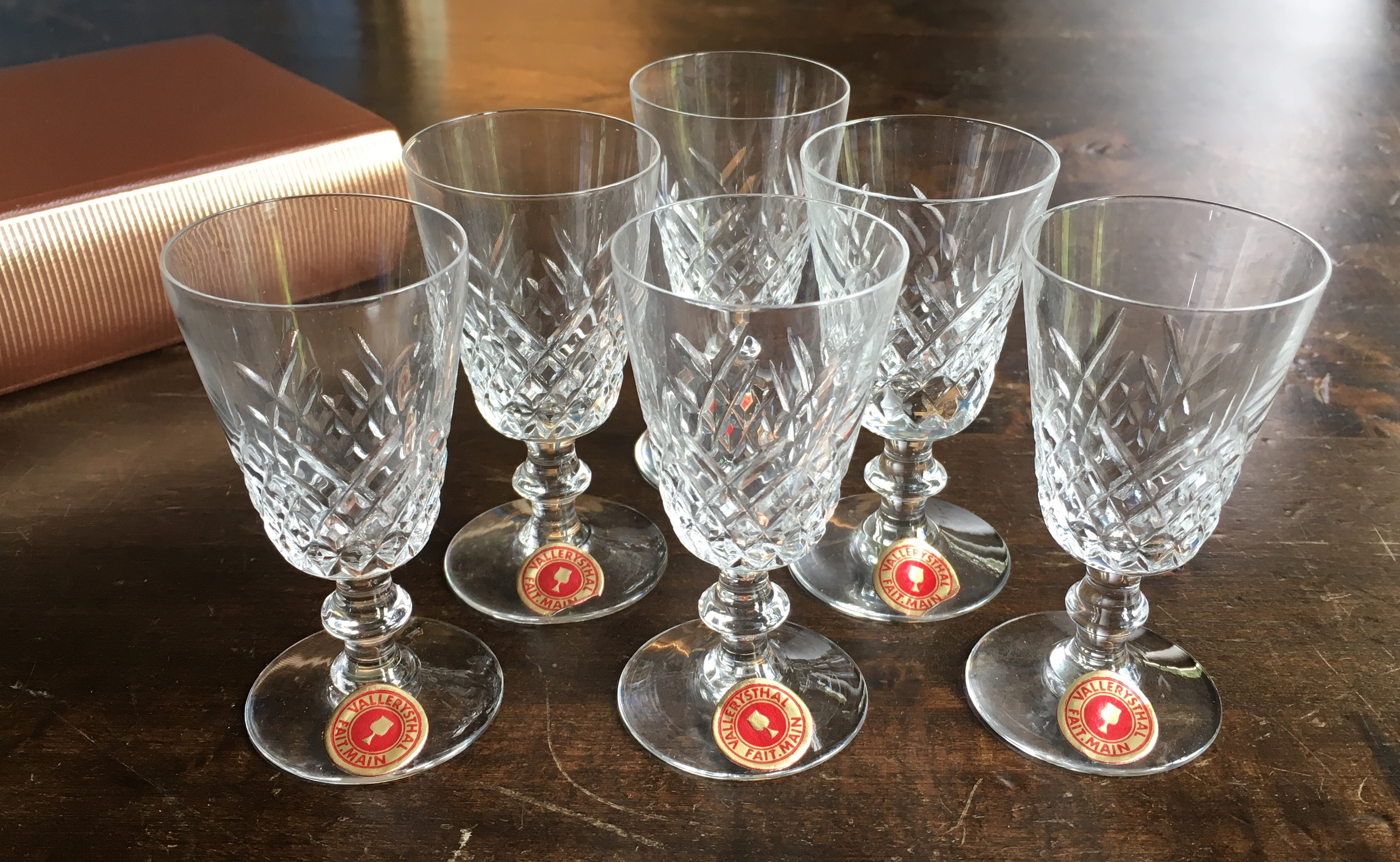
Six cut glass liqueur glasses from Vallérysthal

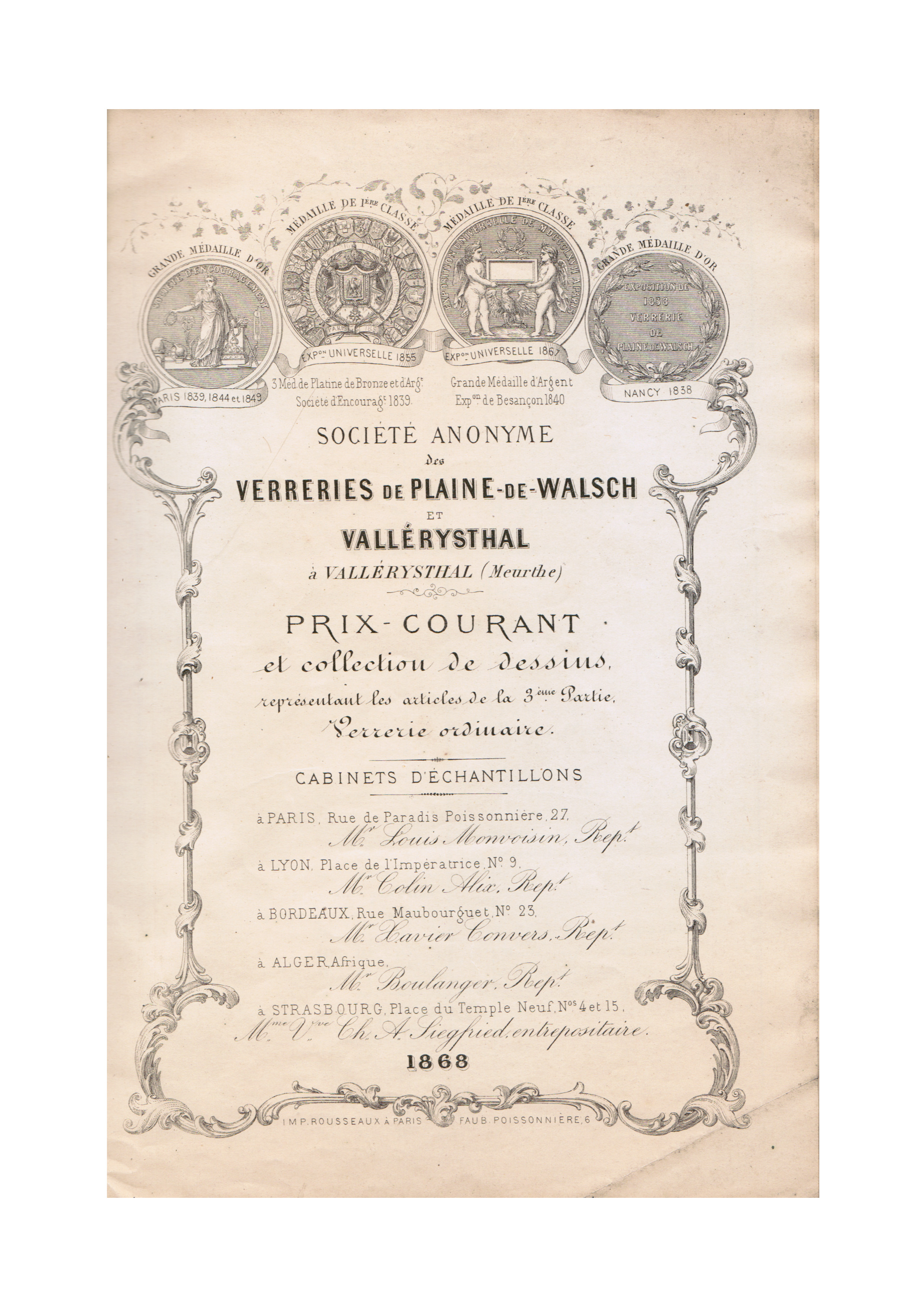
1868 catalogue of Vallérysthal

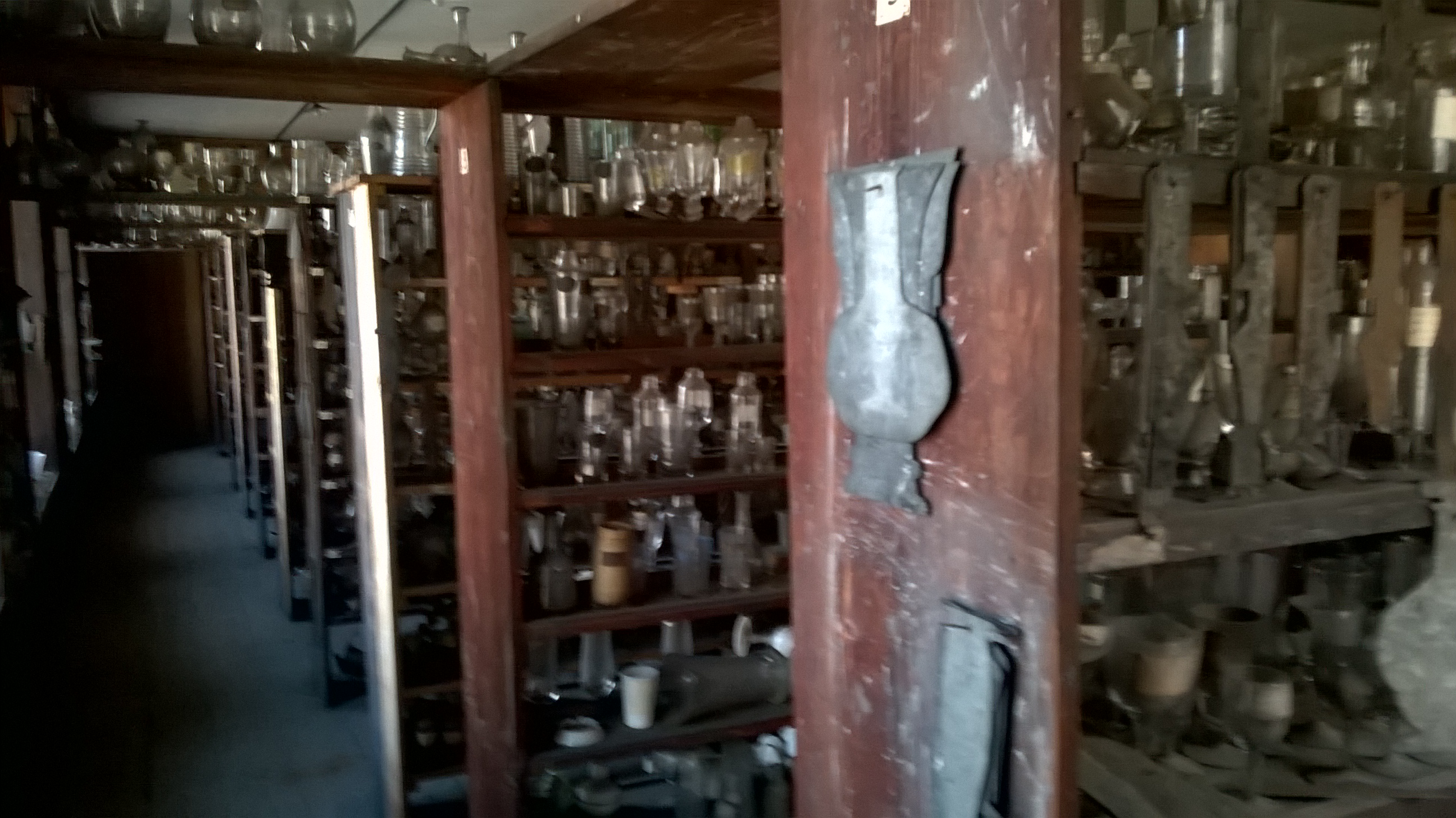
300 years of models and shapes at Vallérysthal crystal works.

Cristallerie de Vallérysthal is a French glass works company set up in 1707 at Troisfontaines (Lorraine). It is now part of the group "Les Jolies Céramiques".

Vallérysthal is reputed for its crystal and opaline glassware.
