= Warsaw Cut Glass Company =

- U.S. National Register of Historic Places
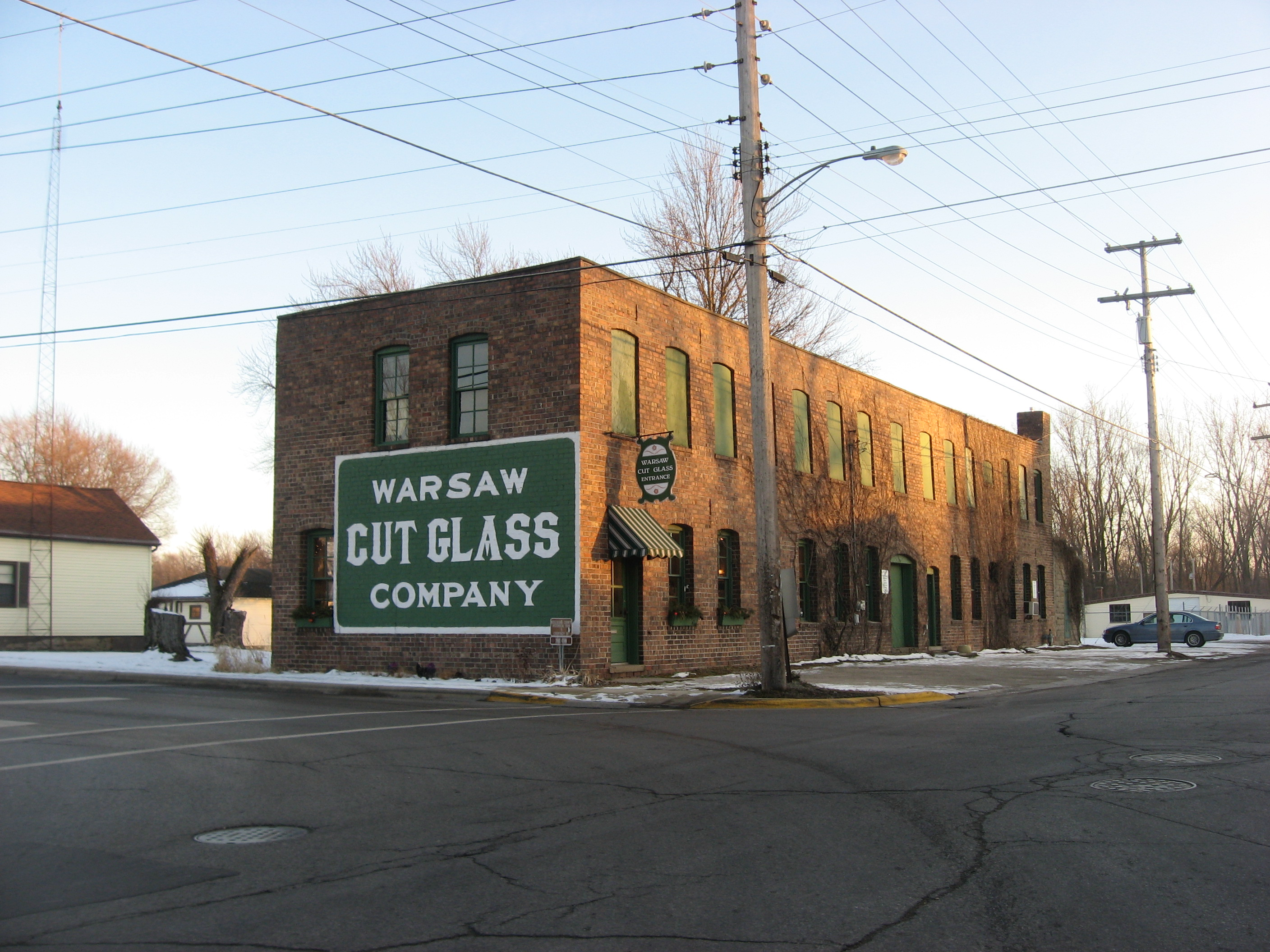
- Warsaw Cut Glass Company, January 2013

- Location within Indiana Location within the United States
- Location: 505 S. Detroit St., Warsaw, Indiana
- Coordinates: 41°14′0″N 85°51′9″W
- Area: 0.5 acres (0.20 ha)
- Built: 1911
- NRHP reference No.: 84001059
- Added to NRHP: March 1, 1984

Warsaw Cut Glass Company is a historic factory building located at Warsaw, Indiana making cut glass. It is a two-story, plus basement, industrial building constructed of paving brick. The building measures 100 feet by 25 feet. Two small additions were constructed in 1912 and the building features an original handpainted sign added in 1915. The company remains in operation.

It was added to the National Register of Historic Places in 1984.
