= Satsuma kiriko =

Traditional Japanese cut glass

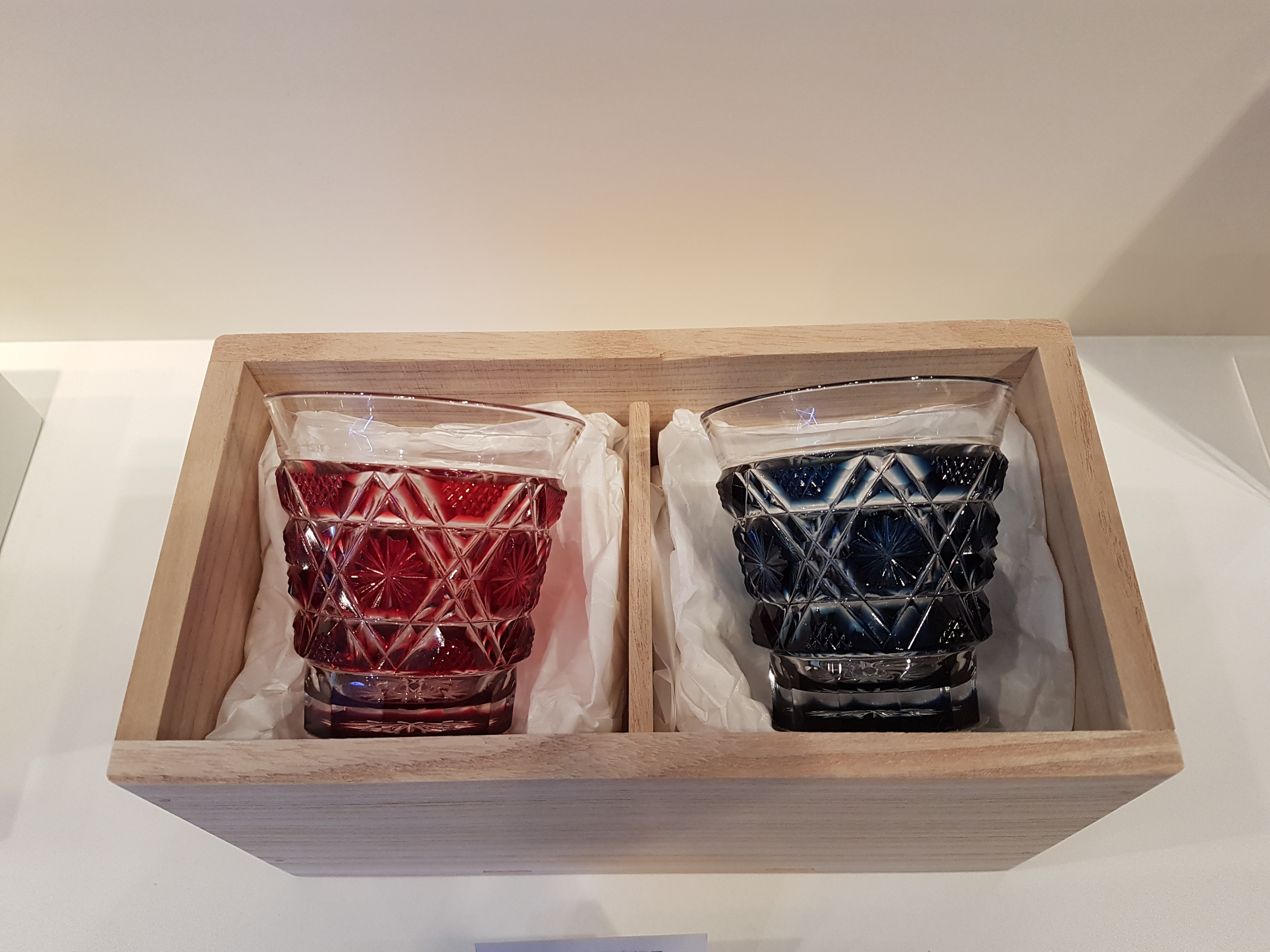
Two cut glass cups

Satsuma kiriko (薩摩切子) is a style of cut glass, now a traditional Japanese craft. It was manufactured by the Satsuma clan from the final years of the Edo period to the beginning of the Meiji period (1868–1912).

== History ==
Shimazu Narioki (1791–1859), a feudal lord of the Edo period, invited glass craftsmen from Edo (now Tokyo) to produce Satsuma kiriko. The manufacturing methods were based on foreign books from Nagasaki. Narioki’s son Shimazu Nariakira introduced it into his Shuseikan Enterprise, the first western-style industrial enterprise in Japan, with factories that produced steel, textiles, and other products. The cut glass was very advanced craftwork. Nariakira was extremely fond of it, and sent it to other feudal lords as presents. After his death, the manufacture of Satsuma kiriko was discontinued in the early Meiji period because of financial difficulties, damage to the factory in the bombardment of Kagoshima, and disturbances during the Satsuma Rebellion. The craftsmen and skills dispersed to Tokyo and Osaka. Only a few pieces of Satsuma kiriko were produced.

== Manufacture of Satsuma Kiriko ==
The Hari Seiko Zensho (Handbook of Glass Technology), written in 1830 by Kazuyoshi Hanai detailed the manufacture of Satsuma kiriko. The Hari Seiko Zensho presented a glassmaking technique influenced heavily by China. Satsuma kiriko was made by melting lead and mixing it with powdered white stone. As the stone and lead was reheated, zinc was sometimes combined with the mix in order to "eliminate impurities". Finally, as the mixture cooled niter was added to it and after melting the compound was shaped into Satsuma kiriko.

== The difference between Edo Kiriko and Satsuma Kiriko ==
Edo kiriko (ja:江戸切子) features transparent and colorless glass, while Satsuma kiriko is more delicate and features overlaid colored glass. According to a recent study, the new one is produced since the section of the colorless Satsuma kiriko is tidied up. The main feature is the deep color of the overlaid colored glass. Also, cutting the glass boldly gives beautiful gradations of color.

== Western influence in Meiji Japan ==
To properly understand Satsuma Kiriko, it can be helpful to understand the Japanese historical context it was developed in. During the Meiji period, Japan began to market goods to the Western market, which saw the manufacture of textiles specifically for a Western audience. Satsuma Kiriko was heavily influenced by Dutch and English glassmaking techniques. Western hunger for Japanese art showed itself in the form of "japonisme", where artists used Japanese motifs and techniques in their art. Vincent Van Gogh was famously influenced by Japanese art.

== Reproduction and present ==
From 1985 a glass factory, an artisan, and a researcher together succeeded in reproducing Satsuma kiriko. In 1989 Satsuma glass industrial art, under the supervision and direct management of Shimadzu Limited, was certified as a traditional artifact of Kagoshima. At present, they produce both reproductions of the old-style Satsuma kiriko and new designs and colors based on that style.

== Area of production ==
Satsuma kiriko is made in Kagoshima Prefecture. The overlaying colored glass and the reproductions are produced in the workshops of Satsuma Glass Studio and Satsuma Vidro Craft. Some Satsuma kiriko production is outsourced to Edo kiriko craftsmen.

== See also ==
- Edo kiriko
- History of glass
- Glass engraving
- Flashed glass
