= Edo kiriko =

Style of cut glass

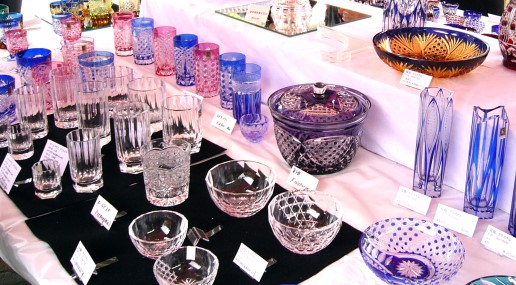
Edo kiriko glassware

Edo kiriko (江戸切子) is a style of cut glass, now a traditional Japanese craft. It originated in Edo (modern-day Tokyo) during the 19th century and is renowned for its clear, intricately cut glass displaying bold geometric patterns.

== History ==
Edo kiriko was first produced in 1834 by Kagaya Kyūbei, a glassware merchant in Edo. In 1873, a Western-style glassworks was established in Shinagawa, Tokyo, and in 1881 British glass expert Emmanuel Hauptmann was invited to Japan to introduce advanced European techniques. These developments led to the refinement of Edo kiriko, and its pieces were subsequently showcased at international expositions, earning global recognition. As the techniques for cutting and polishing developed, the quality of Edo kiriko improved steadily, reaching the height of its popularity in the early years of the 20th century.

== Manufacture ==
The manufacturing process of Edo kiriko involves six main stages, which are typically carried out in a single, continuous process. First, the colored glass overlay is blown over a clear inner layer. Next, the design is marked on the glass using red iron oxide pigment, followed by a rough cutting of the pattern on a grinding wheel with a water-sand mixture as a lubricant. This is then refined by detailed cutting with a fine abrasive or diamond wheel. From there the glass is first polished with a whetstone and finished with a wooden wheel using polishing powders. Combined, this process produces the characteristic brilliance and clarity of Edo kiriko.

=== Traditional design ===
Among the traditional patterns of Edo kiriko, the Nanako (魚子) design is particularly renowned. This pattern, resembling fish eggs, is created by carving intersecting thin lines that produce a shimmering effect on the glass surface.

== Difference between Edo Kiriko and Satsuma Kiriko ==
While both Edo kiriko and Satsuma kiriko are forms of Japanese cut glass, they differ in materials and technique. Edo kiriko is typically crafted from transparent or lightly tinted glass with bold geometric patterns, whereas Satsuma kiriko is known for its use of overlaying colored glass and more delicate designs.

== Modern era and recognition ==
Edo kiriko experienced a revival after World War II, as contemporary artisans embraced traditional techniques while introducing modern design elements. The craft was designated a "Tokyo Traditional Craft Industry" in 1985 and later recognized as a "National Traditional Craft" in 2002, reaffirming its status as an important cultural asset.

== See also ==
- Flashed glass
- Glass engraving
- History of glass
- Japanese craft
- Satsuma kiriko
