= Troisfontaines =

Troisfontaines Dreibrunnen (German)
- Commune
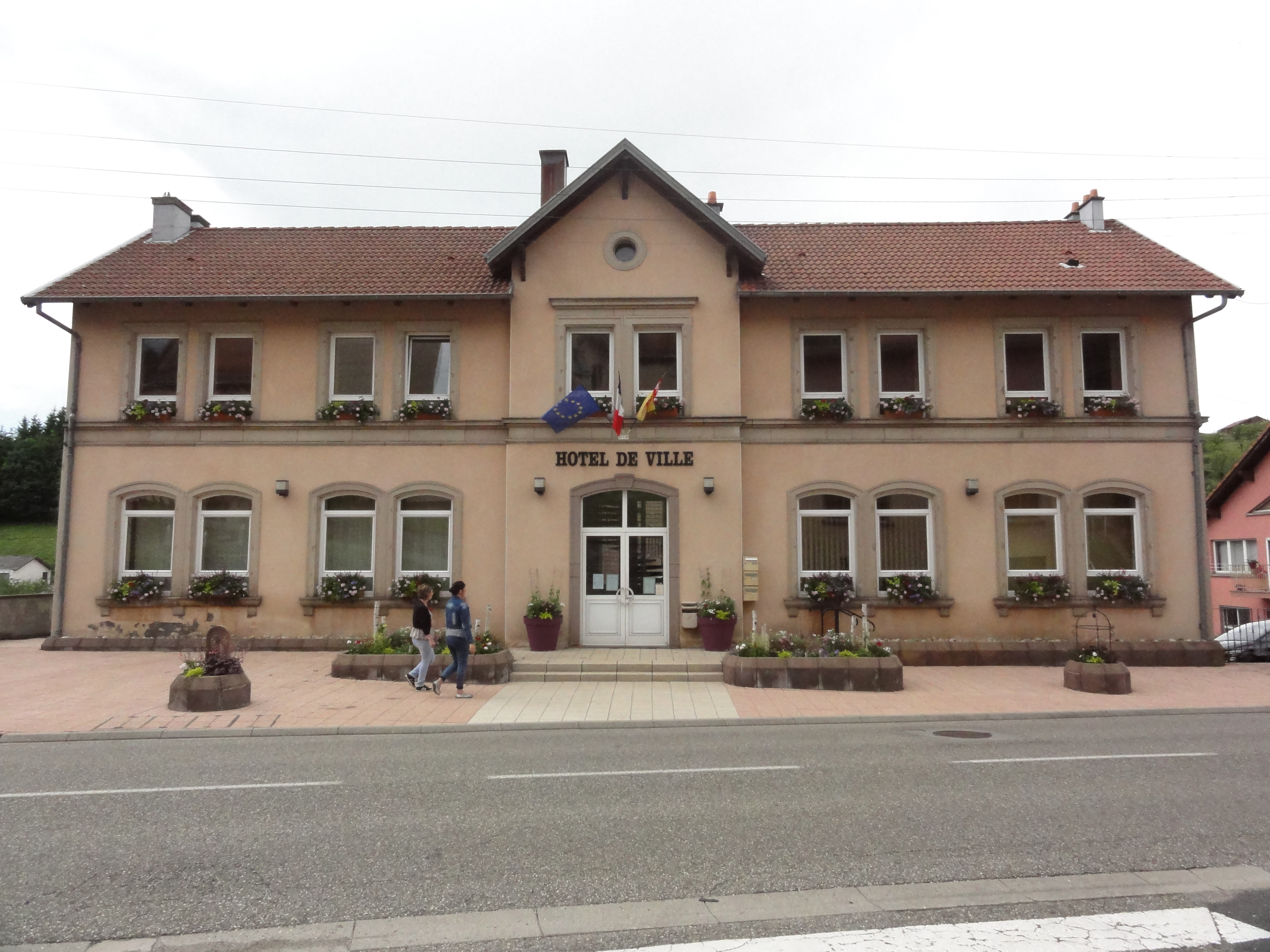
- The town hall in Troisfontaines

- Coat of arms
- Location of Troisfontaines
- Location within France Location within Grand Est
- Coordinates: 48°40′13″N 7°07′04″E
- Country: France
- Region: Grand Est
- Department: Moselle
- Arrondissement: Sarrebourg-Château-Salins
- Canton: Phalsbourg
- Intercommunality: Sarrebourg - Moselle Sud

Government
  - Mayor (2020–2026): Sébastien Hornsperger
- Area^{1}: 12.9 km^{2} (5.0 sq mi)
- Highest elevation: 446 m (1,463 ft)
- Lowest elevation: 275 m (902 ft)
- Population (2023): 1,267
  - Density: 98.2/km^{2} (254/sq mi)
- Time zone: UTC+01:00 (CET)
  - Summer (DST): UTC+02:00 (CEST)
- INSEE/Postal code: 57680 /57870
- ^{1} French Land Register data, which excludes lakes, ponds, glaciers > 1 km^{2} (0.386 sq mi or 247 acres) and river estuaries.

Troisfontaines (French pronunciation: [tʁwɑfɔ̃tɛn]; German: Dreibrunnen; both lit. 'Three Fountains') is a commune located in the department of Moselle, France.

== Geography ==
The commune is composed of three villages: Troisfontaines, Biberkirch and Vallérysthal.

The municipality is located in the Rhine watershed within the Rhine-Meuse basin. It is drained by the Bièvre, the Krappenthal stream and the Schindelthal stream.

The old railroad line of the municipality has been converted into a bicycle path.

== History ==
The territory of the commune was inhabited in prehistoric times and in Gallo-Roman times.

A glass factory, founded in 1699, was the origin of the creation of Troisfontaines.

The village was completely destroyed during the Thirty Years War and then repopulated in the 17th and 18th centuries by financial incentive (tax exemption for those who rebuilt a ruined house). Troisfontaines being at that time German-speaking, the efforts of repopulation focused on attracting German-speaking populations, such as Swiss, Bavarians, and Tyroleans.

A new, larger glass factory was established in 1707. In 1892, the community was connected to the railroad network.

The church only dates from the beginning of the 20th century. Previously Troisfontaines, as well as Hartzviller, were part of the parish of Biberkirch where the church was located.

On 30 December 1967 the commune of Troisfontaines merged with that of Biberkirch.

On 26 December 1999 Troisfontaines was hit by a storm that ravaged a large part of the forests, especially the one near Vallérysthal.

== The village ==
The village has three fountains as its name implies: a monument is dedicated on the site of the Hoffe (founded in 2005-2006).

== Economics ==
- SCHOTT VTF glassworks
- distillerie-du-castor
- glaziery
- Vallérysthal crystal maker
- distillery
- many shops
- bank
- business complex (nursery, medical offices, post office, ATM, daycare center)

== Administration ==
List of mayors
Start	Finish	Name
1850	1855	Laurent Gérard
1855	1860	Eugène Chrétien
1860	1865	Joseph Diedat
1865	1871	Adrien Thouvenin
1871	1872	Guillaume Aril
1872	1873	Jacques Baumgarten
1873		Jean-Baptiste Feltz
	1884	Baltasard Marbre
1884	1891	Auguste Stengel
1891	1896	Paul Warsow
1896	1905	Joseph Kuchly
1905	1914	Dominique Helwig
1914	1918	Jules Alt
1918	1927	Edouard Bolle
1927	1929	Edmond Hanus
1929	1938	Pierre Stenger
1938	1945	Jean-Baptiste Litscher
1945	1965	Charles Meyer
1965	1983	Maurice Jarrige
1983	1989	Jean Kieffer
1989	2008	Jean Litscher
2008	2014	Michel Kuchly
2014	2026	Sébastien Hornsperger

== Places and monuments ==
- Prehistoric stone tombs
- Gallo-Roman remains: fragments of stelae, bas-relief of Mercury, statue of an equestrian god
- Old mill of the Cross
- Vallérysthal crystal maker

== Religious buildings ==
The church of Saint-Nicolas de Biberkirch was built in 1719 and renovated in 1836. It houses altars and an organ.

The Neo-Gothic church of Troisfontaines was built in 1914.

The municipality also houses the chapel of St. Augustine of Vallerysthal.

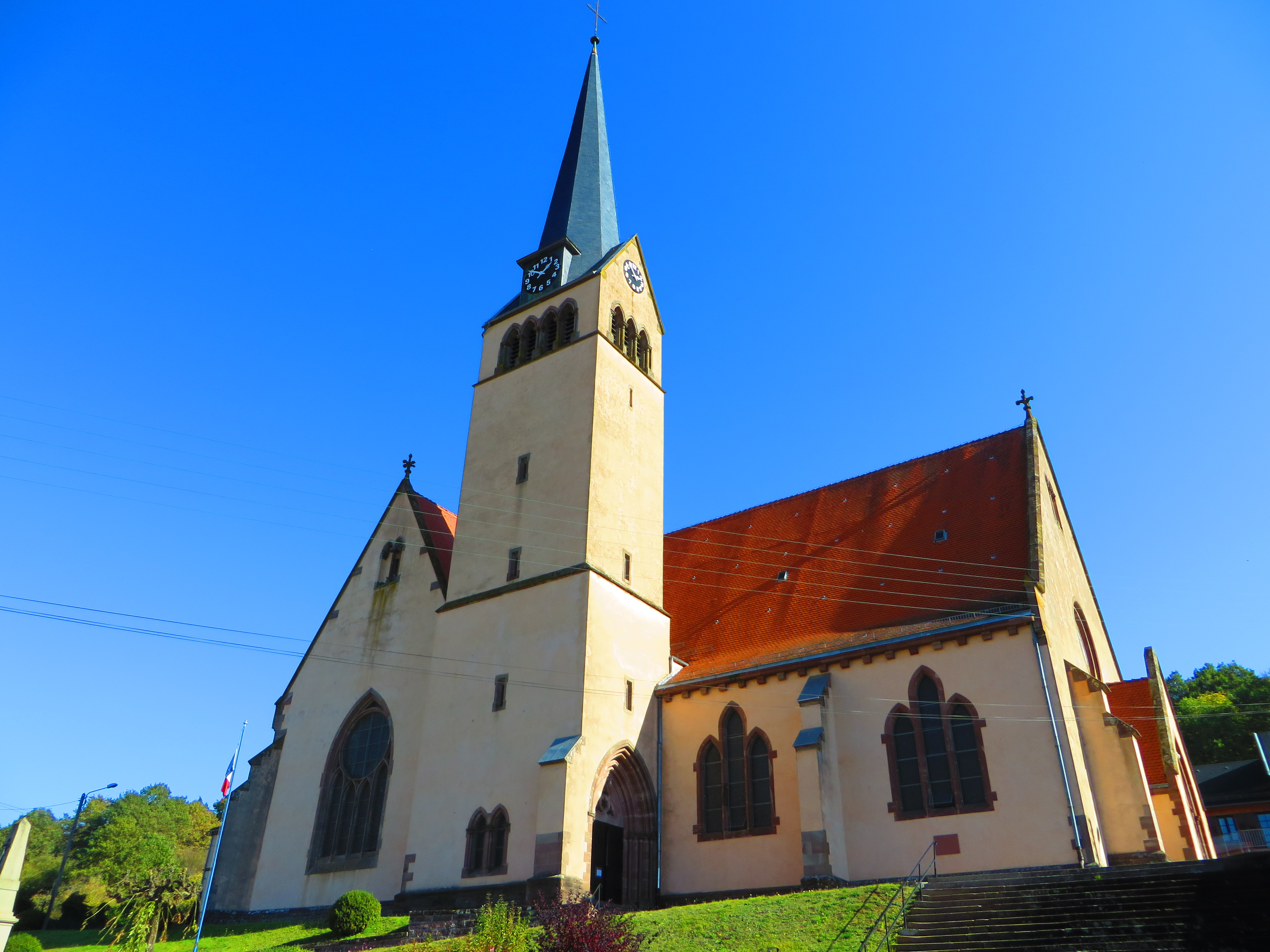
Church of Saint-Nicolas de Biberkirch

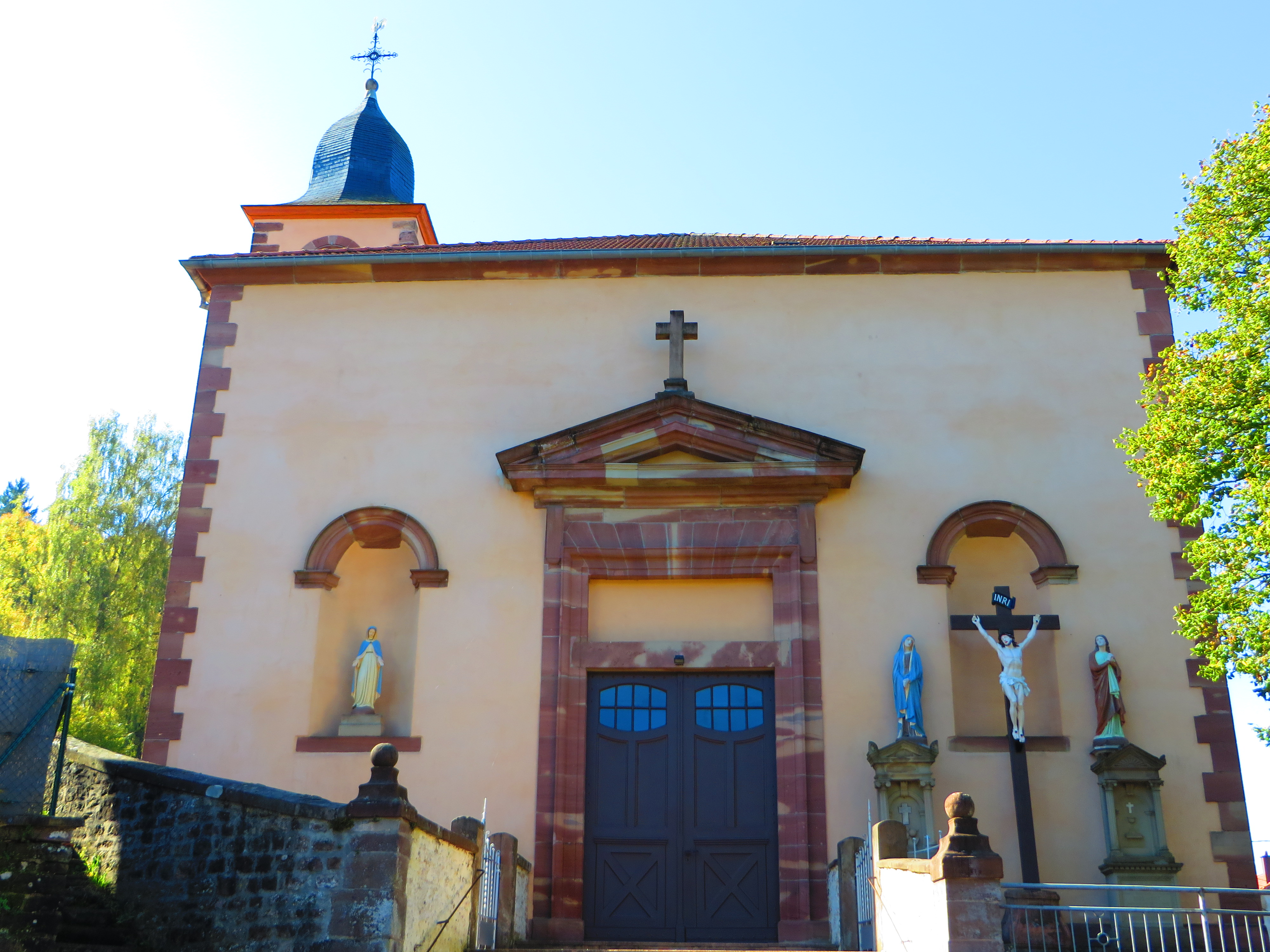
Neo-Gothic church of Troisfontaines

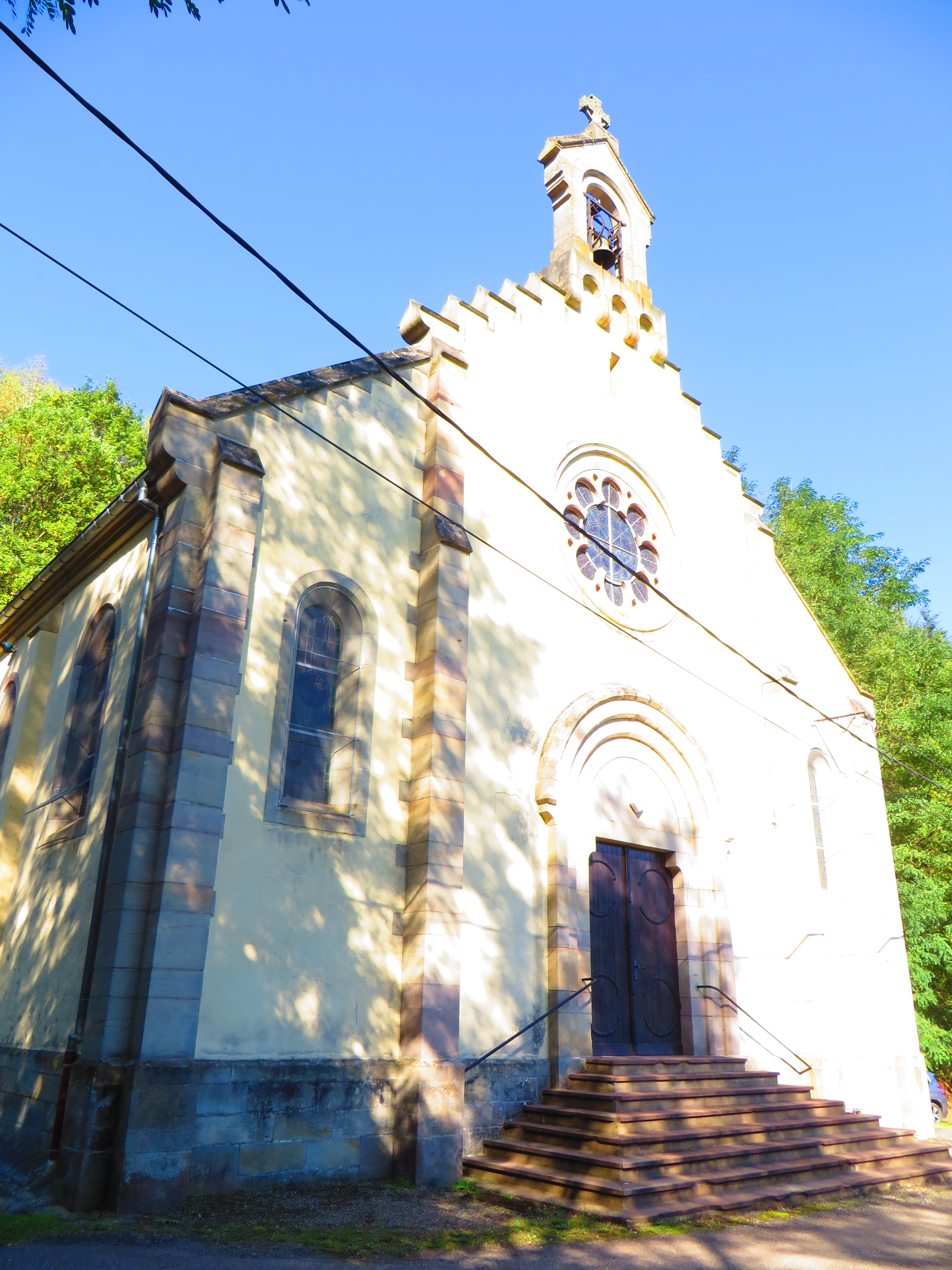
Chapel of St. Augustine of Vallerysthal

== Leisure areas ==
A recreation area is located around the Vallérysthal's pond. It offers fishing and bowling, and includes a barbecue and picnic area.

A bike path of approximately 12 kilometres (7 mi) connects Troisfontaines to Sarrebourg.

STRV, Trial Club Valley of the Bievre, a round of the World Championship trials is held in Troisfontaines.
