= Opaline glass =

Term referring to a number of glassware styles

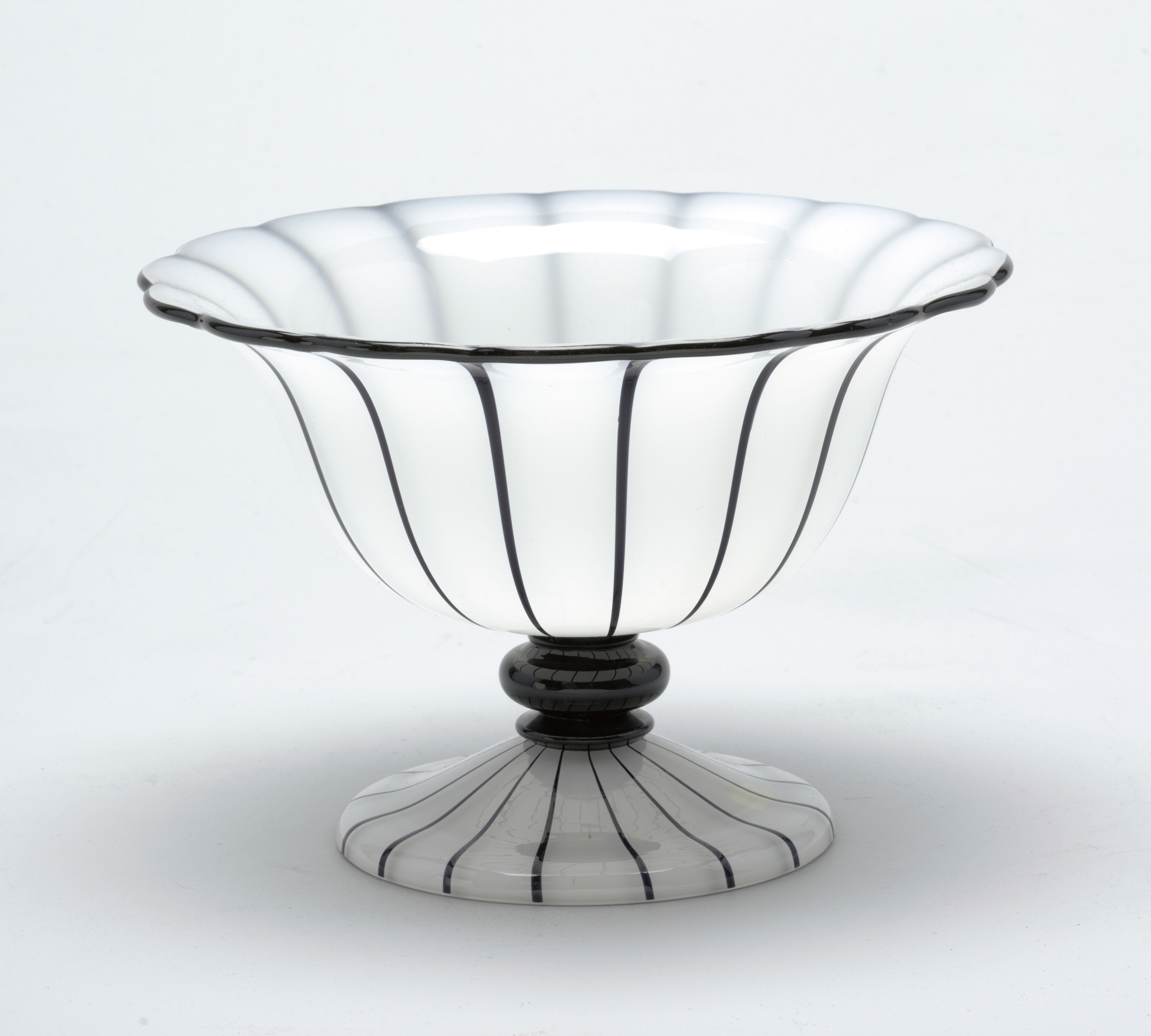
Austrian opaline glass bowl, 1914

Opaline glass is a style of antique glassware that was produced in Europe, particularly 19th-century France. It was originally made by adding materials such as bone ash to lead-crystal, creating a semi-opaque glass with reddish opalescence.

== Description ==
Opaline glass gets its distinctive iridescent milkiness from opacifying substances added during the mixing process, including sodium phosphate, sodium chloride, calcium phosphate, calcium chloride, tin oxide and talc. The glass can thus take on different colors and present variable shades, depending on the mixture and quantity of opacifying material substance: from white to gray, to pink, to lavender green, to golden yellow, to light blue, up to blue and black.

== History ==
The first opaline glass was made in Murano in the sixteenth century, with the addition of calcium phosphate, resulting from the calcination of bones. The technique did not remain secret and was copied in Germany, where this glass was known as bein glass (lit. 'bone glass'). Opaline glass was produced in large quantities in France in the nineteenth century and reached the apex of diffusion and popularity during the empire of Napoleon III; but the pieces made in the period of Napoleon I, which are translucent, are the most sought after by the antiques market.

The production centers were in Le Creusot, in Baccarat, in Saint-Louis-lès-Bitche. In England it was produced in the eighteenth century, in Bristol. From the mid-nineteenth century opaque opal glass objects came into fashion. At the Sèvres Porcelain Manufactory, a production line in white milk glass, decorated by hand, was experimented with, which attempted to imitate the transparency of Chinese porcelain.

With this particular glass objects of common use were handcrafted: vases, bowls, cups, goblets, carafes, perfume bottles, boxes, lamps. Some objects were also decorated in cold enamel, with flowers, with landscapes, with birds. Sometimes a bronze or silver support was added to the opal vase.

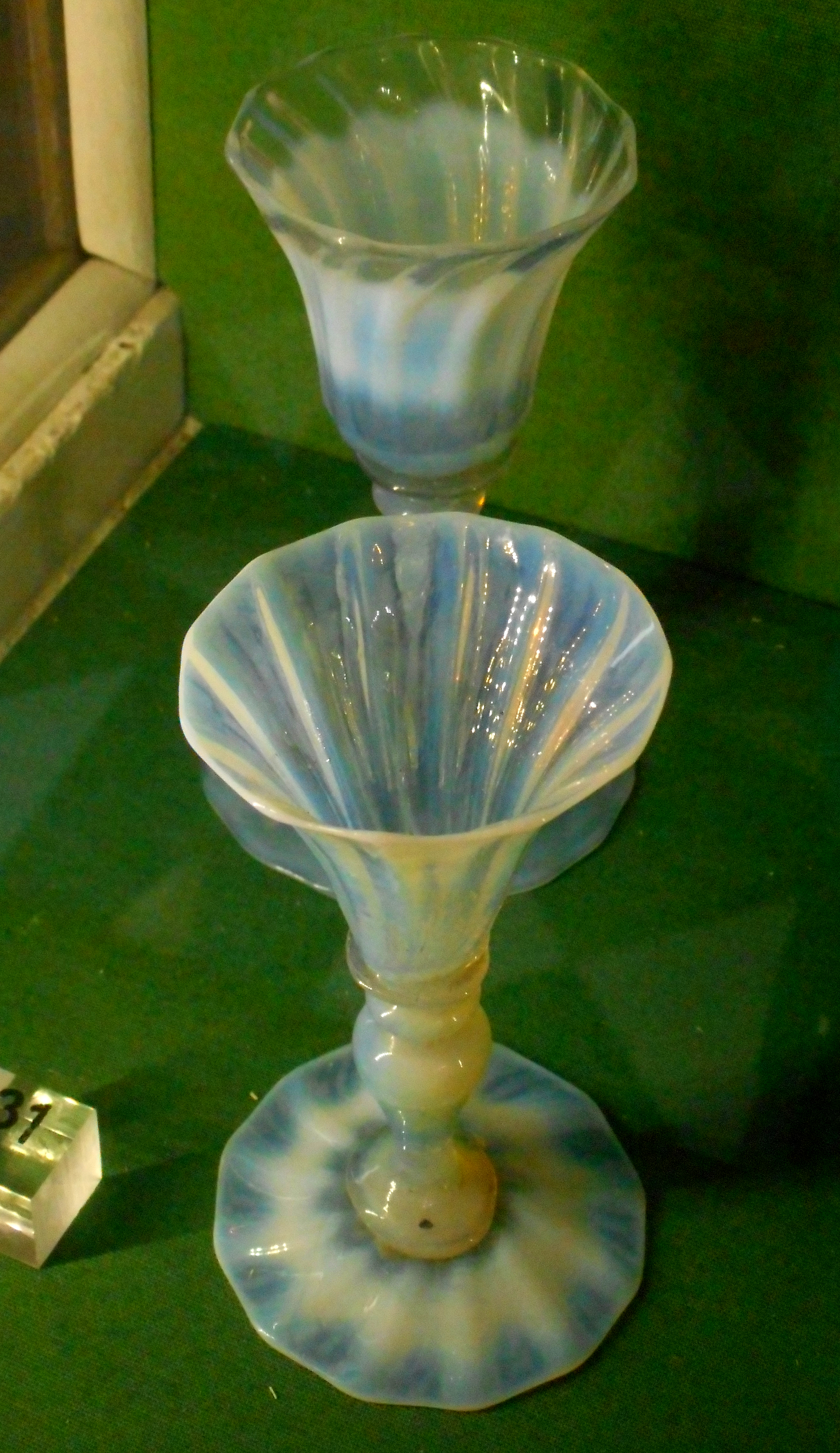
17th-century Venetian opaline glasses

Most green or yellow opaline glass is uranium glass.

== 19th century ==
Many different pieces were produced in opaline glass, including vases, bowls, cups, coupes, decanters, perfume bottles, boxes, clocks and other implements.

All opaline glass is hand-blown and has a rough or polished pontil on the bottom. There are no seams and no machine engraving, and most opaline glass is not branded or signed. Many pieces of opaline glass are decorated with gilding. Some with handpainted flowers or birds. Several have bronze ormolu mounts, rims, hinges or holders.

== 20th century ==
The French factory Portieux Vallérysthal in 1930 has put opal glass objects on the market in a particular blue-azure color. Some pieces have decorations in pure gold or polychrome enamels and are sometimes equipped with supports or hinges in gilded bronze (sets of plates, cruets, sets of glasses and cups, boxes, lamps, flacons, chandeliers). The blue-blue color of the glass is inspired by that of the American robin's egg.

In the late 20th century the venetian master glassmaker Vincenzo Nason, began producing a similar type of glass, labelled 'Veritable Opaline de Murano'.
