= Cut glass =

Glass with geometrical incised patterns

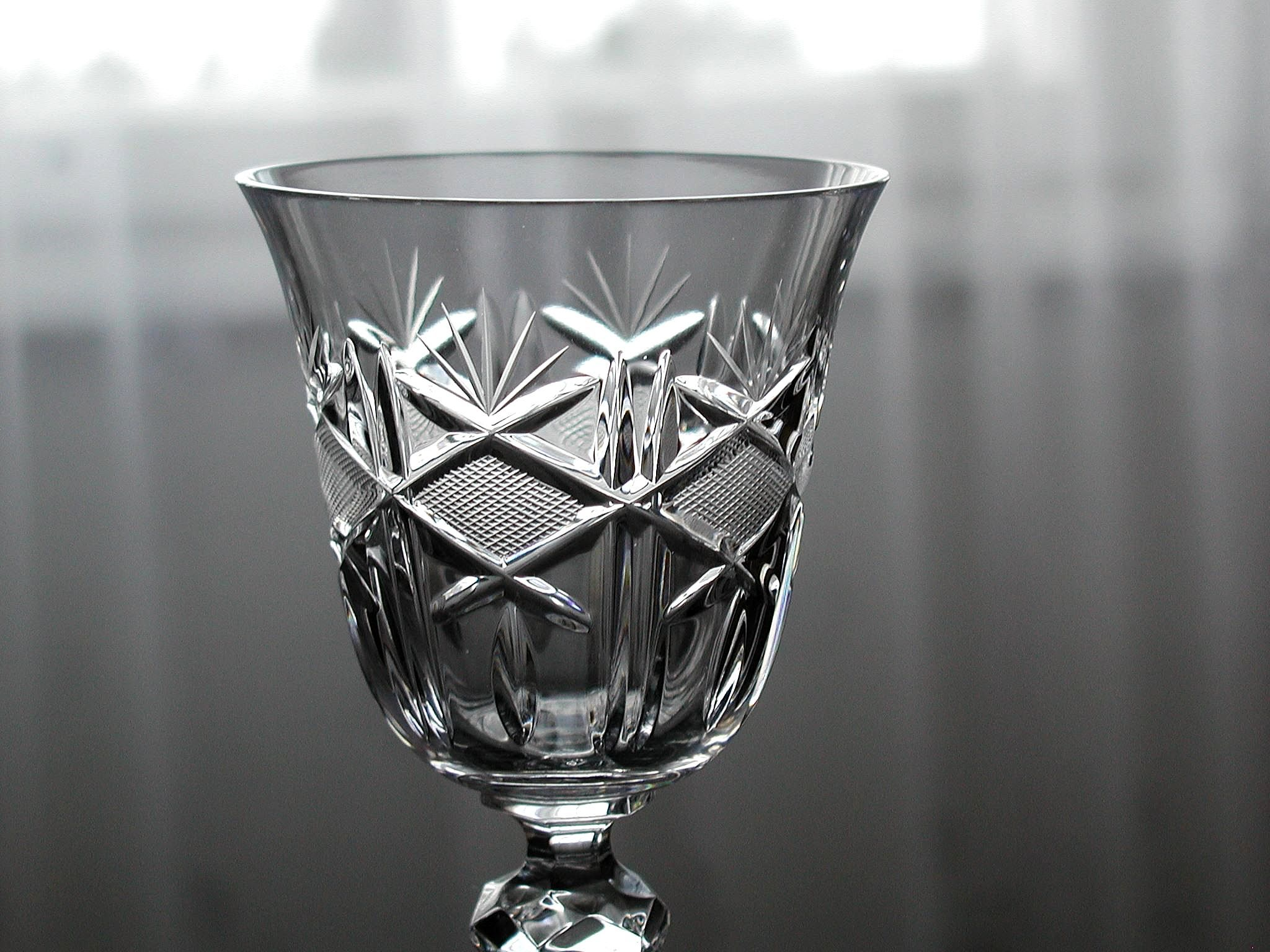
Bowl of a wine glass in typical cut glass style

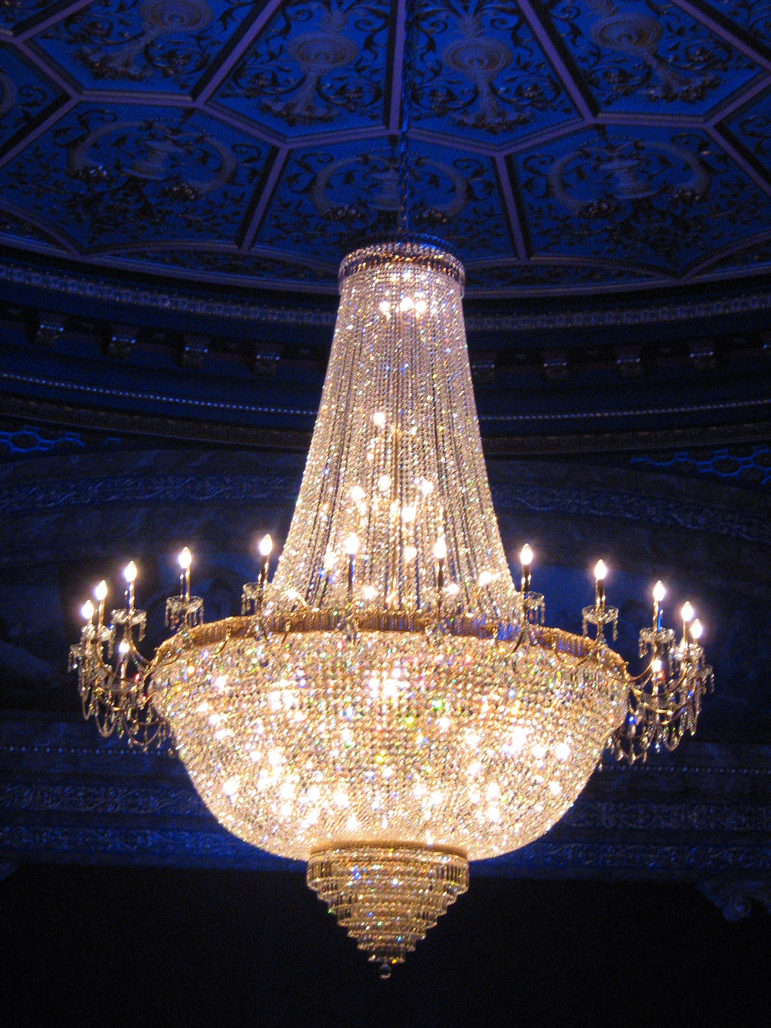
Cut glass chandelier in Edinburgh

Cut glass or cut-glass is a technique and a style of decorating glass. For some time the style has often been produced by other techniques such as the use of moulding, but the original technique of cutting glass on an abrasive wheel is still used in luxury products. On glassware vessels, the style typically consists of furrowed faces at angles to each other in complicated patterns, while for lighting fixtures, the style consists of flat or curved facets on small hanging pieces, often all over. Historically, cut glass was shaped using "coldwork" techniques of grinding or drilling, applied as a secondary stage to a piece of glass made by conventional processes such as glassblowing.

Today, the glass is often mostly or entirely shaped in the initial process by using a mould (pressed glass), or imitated in clear plastic. Traditional hand-cutting continues, but gives a much more expensive product. Lead glass has long been misleadingly called "crystal" by the industry, evoking the glamour and expense of rock crystal, or carved transparent quartz, and most manufacturers now describe their product as cut crystal glass.

There are two main types of object made using cut glass: firstly drinking glasses and their accompanying decanters and jugs, and secondly chandeliers and other light fittings. Both began to be made using the cut glass style in England around 1730, following the development there of a reliable process for making very clear lead glass with a high refractive index. Cut glass requires relatively thick glass, as the cutting removes much of the depth, and earlier clear glass would mostly have appeared rather cloudy if made thick enough to cut. For both types of object, some pieces are still made in traditional styles, broadly similar to those of the 18th century, but other glassmakers have applied modern design styles.

Expensive drinking glasses had previously mostly concentrated on elegant shapes of extreme thinness. If there was decoration it was mostly either internal, with hollow bubble or coloured spirals within the stem ("twists"), or surface decoration in enamelled glass or glass engraving. Outside Venice and Spain, lighting fittings had not previously made much use of glass in Europe; the enamelled mosque lamp of Islamic art was a different matter. But cut glass "drops", faceted in a style derived from gem cutting in jewellery, refracted and spread the light in way that was new, and were enthusiastically embraced by makers and their customers. The main skeleton of the chandelier was very often metal, but this was often all but hidden by a profusion of faceted glass pieces, held in place by metal wire.

== Technique ==
Czech glass-cutter at work

In the first century AD, Pliny the Elder described how patterns may be cut on glass vessels by pressing them against a rotating wheel of hard stone. The process of cutting has stayed the same in modern times apart from changes in details since that description in the middle of the first century AD. It has always used a small rotating wheel of, or coated with, some abrasive substance, and usually with a liquid lubricant such as water, perhaps mixed with sand, falling onto the area being worked and then being collected below. The wheels were originally powered by treadles, but by the mid-19th century workshops had several stations linked to steam power. Today electric power is used. For cutting flat facets a turntable device called a "lap", already used in gem-cutting, was adopted.

Typically the design is marked with paint on the glass before cutting – in England red is usually used. One advantage of cut glass for the manufacturer is that it can very often be arranged for the small flaws such as bubbles that are inevitable in a proportion of glass pieces, and would lead to a clear piece being rejected, to be placed in the areas to be cut away. Conversely, if imitation cut glass using moulds is made, the complexity of the mould shapes greatly increases the number of faults and rejects.

A second operation polishes the cut glass, traditionally using a wooden or cork wheel "fed with putty powder and water". In the late 19th century, an alternative method using fluoric acid was introduced; this made the process of polishing faster and cheaper. However, it "gives a dull finish and tends to round off the edges of the cuts".

Labour was the main cost in making cut glass. Arguing against the reduction of tariffs in 1888, a leading figure in the American industry claimed that "We take a piece of glass .... costing 20 cents and .... in many cases put $36 of labor on it".

== History ==
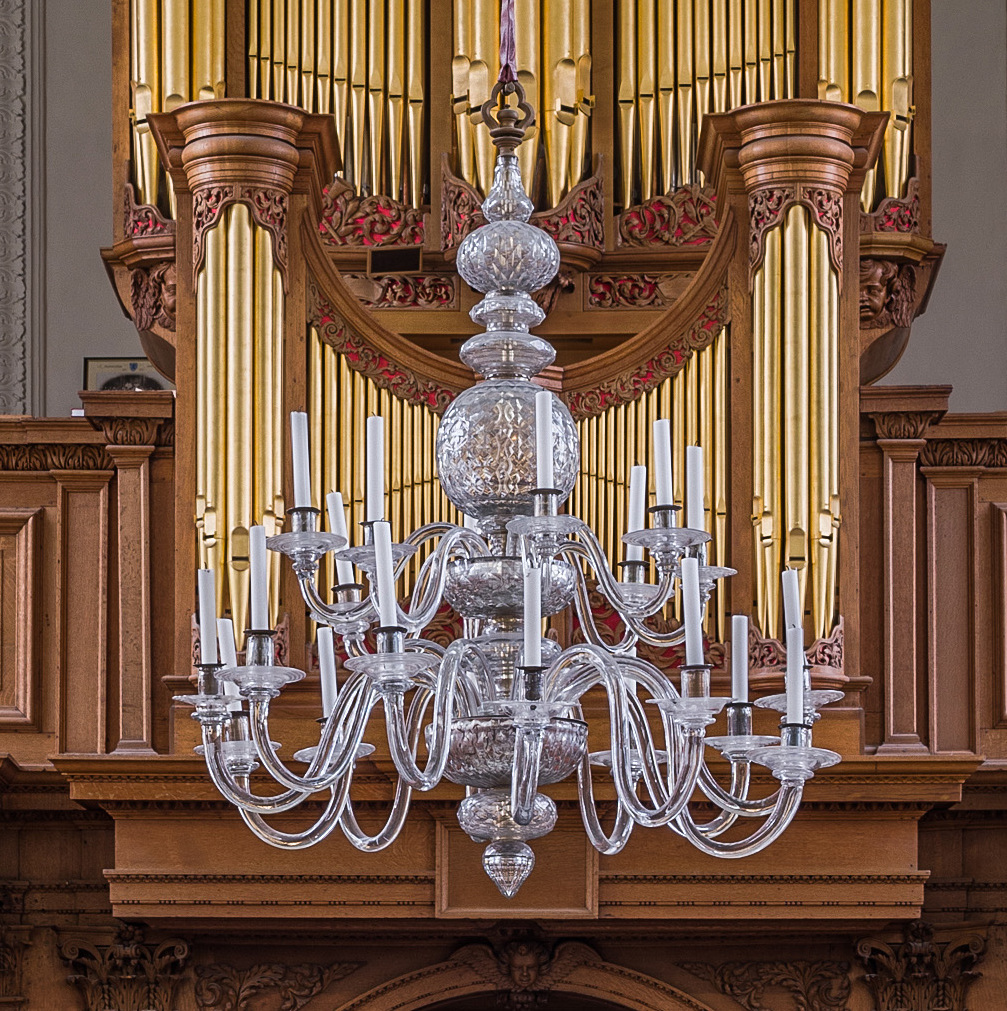
Chandelier in the chapel of Emmanuel College, Cambridge, donated in 1732, one of the earliest datable cut glass examples. The shape follows contemporary brass examples, with glass branches but no "drops"; only the pieces down the stem are cut, mostly with flat facets.

Technically, the decorative "cutting" of glass is very ancient, although the term "cut glass" generally refers to pieces from the 18th century onwards. The Bronze Age Indus Valley Civilization made glass beads that were engraved with simple shapes. Ancient Roman glass used a variety of techniques, but mostly large amounts of drilling, often followed by polishing, to produce the deeply under-cut cage cups, objects of extreme luxury, cameo glass in two colours, and objects cut in relief, of which the Lycurgus Cup is the outstanding survivor.

Islamic art, especially that of the Fatimid court in Egypt, valued bowls and other objects in "carved", that is, cut rock crystal (quartz, a clear mineral), and this style was also produced in glass, which was cheaper and easier to work. Cameo glass was also produced. Similar relief effects were also achieved even more cheaply in mould-blown glass. The 13 or 14 surviving examples of the so-called Hedwig glasses were probably made by Islamic artists, but perhaps for the European market. Perhaps from the 12th century, they are either very late examples of Islamic glass-cutting, or isolated ones of medieval European use of the technique.

Very shallowly scratched or cut engraved glass was revived by at least the Renaissance, but there was very little use of deeper cutting which, however, continued to be used in rock crystal and other forms of hardstone cutting. In Germany in the late 17th and early 18th centuries there was a revival, for "two generations", of cut relief decoration, water-powered and imitating rock crystal. Typical pieces were cups and goblets with coats of arms surrounded by rich Baroque ornament, with the background cut away to leave the reliefs raised. This is called the Hochschnitt ("high cut") style.

In the later 17th century George Ravenscroft developed a cheap and reliable lead "crystal" glass with a high refractive index in England, which various other glassmakers adopted. After some time, the potential of cut glass using this basic material began to be realized; a high lead content also made the glass easier to cut.

=== Chandeliers ===
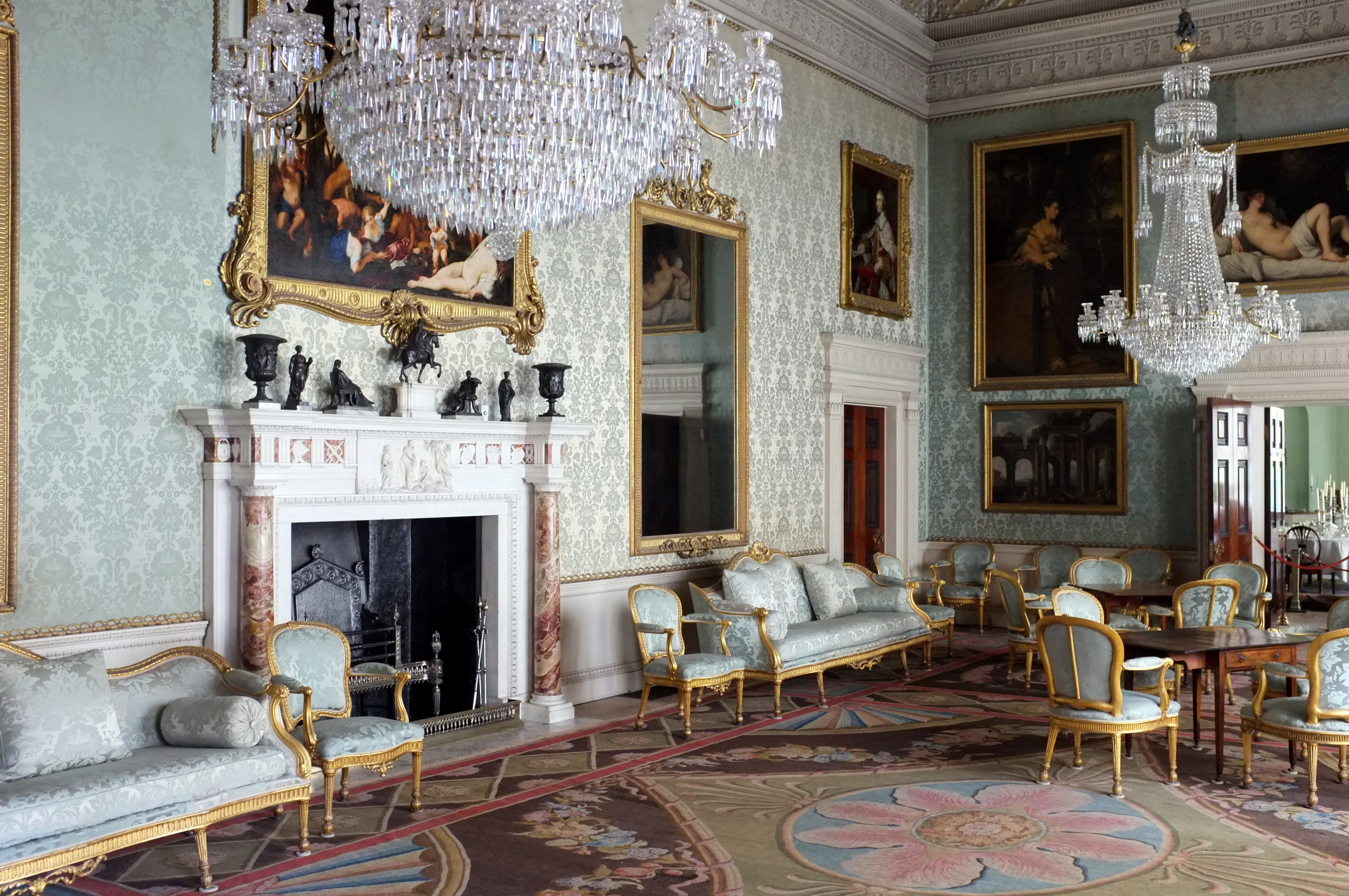
Pair of Regency chandeliers in Saltram House, England

In the early 18th century, bevelled edges to large mirrors became fashionable in England, achieved by rubbing with abrasives, but also by "cutting". The making of "looking glasses" was a different branch of glassmaking from the makers of drinking glasses, and it seems to have been in the former that "the craft of cutting was born", and the mirror makers were the workshops who expanded into chandeliers.

A London glassmaker advertised in 1727 that he sold "Looking Glasses, Coach Glasses and Glass Schandeliers". The earliest examples, like that given to the chapel in Emmanuel College, Cambridge, in 1732, were glass versions of the standard brass designs long used in England, imported or locally made versions of a Netherlandish and north French design style that had been developed since the 15th century. Around the mid-century, designs took up the use of multiple faceted pendants, which had been used in the enormously expensive chandeliers of the French court, where instead of glass carved clear rock crystal (quartz) had been used.

Over the rest of the 18th century, and the early part of the next the number of drops increased, and the main stem of the chandelier, typically in metal, tended to disappear behind long chains of them. By the Regency period there might be "some thirty drops in perhaps six or eight graded sizes, and each drop might have 32 facets on each side. Costs soared." The dominance of cut glass in other lighting devices such as candlesticks, sconces, girandoles, and lamps was never as complete, but all were often made in it.

By 1800 it was already common to dismantle chandeliers and reconfigure them into a more fashionable shape, and subsequently most old chandeliers have been converted from candles to electricity, often after a period as gasoliers using lamp oil.

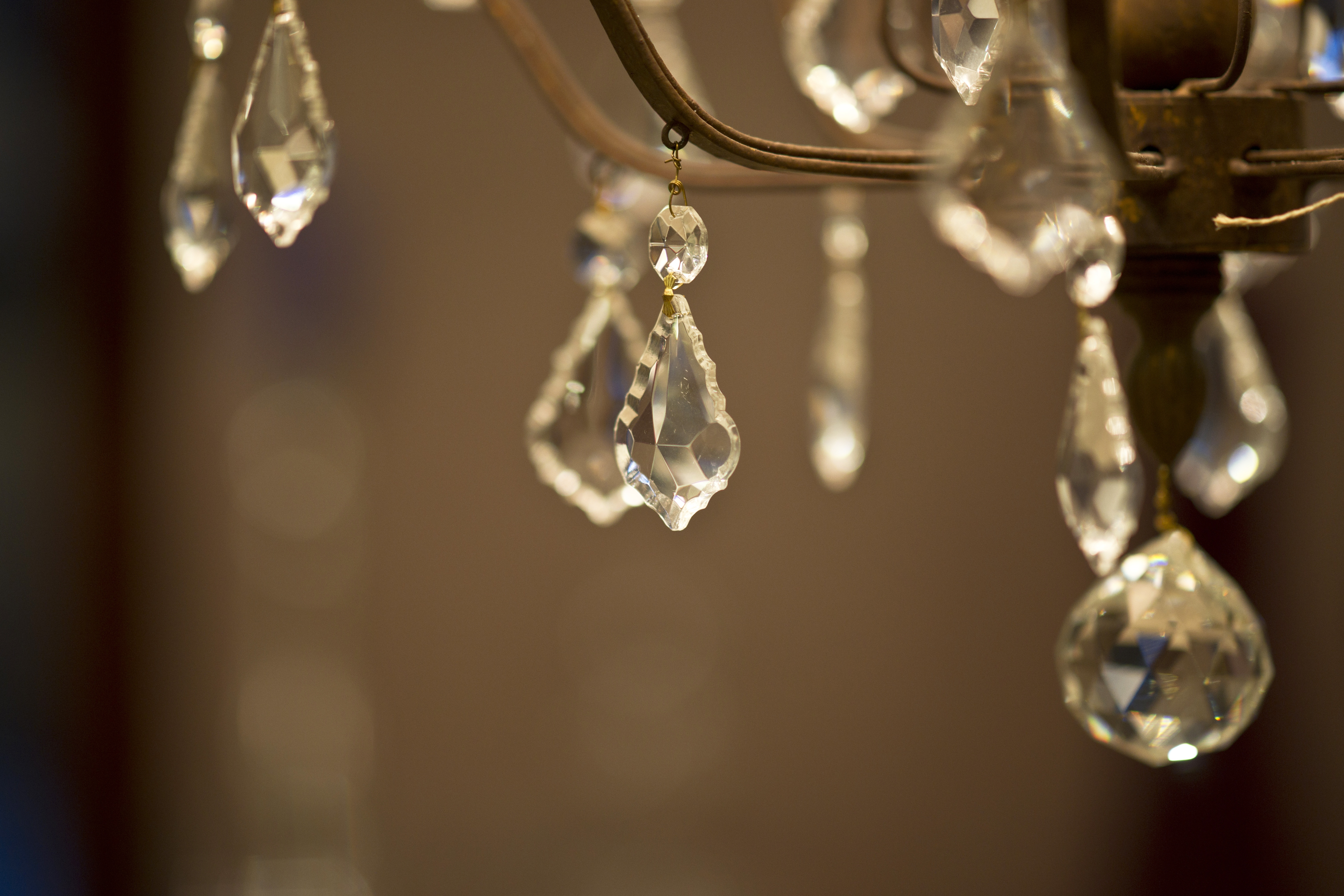
Detail of cut glass "drops" or pendants

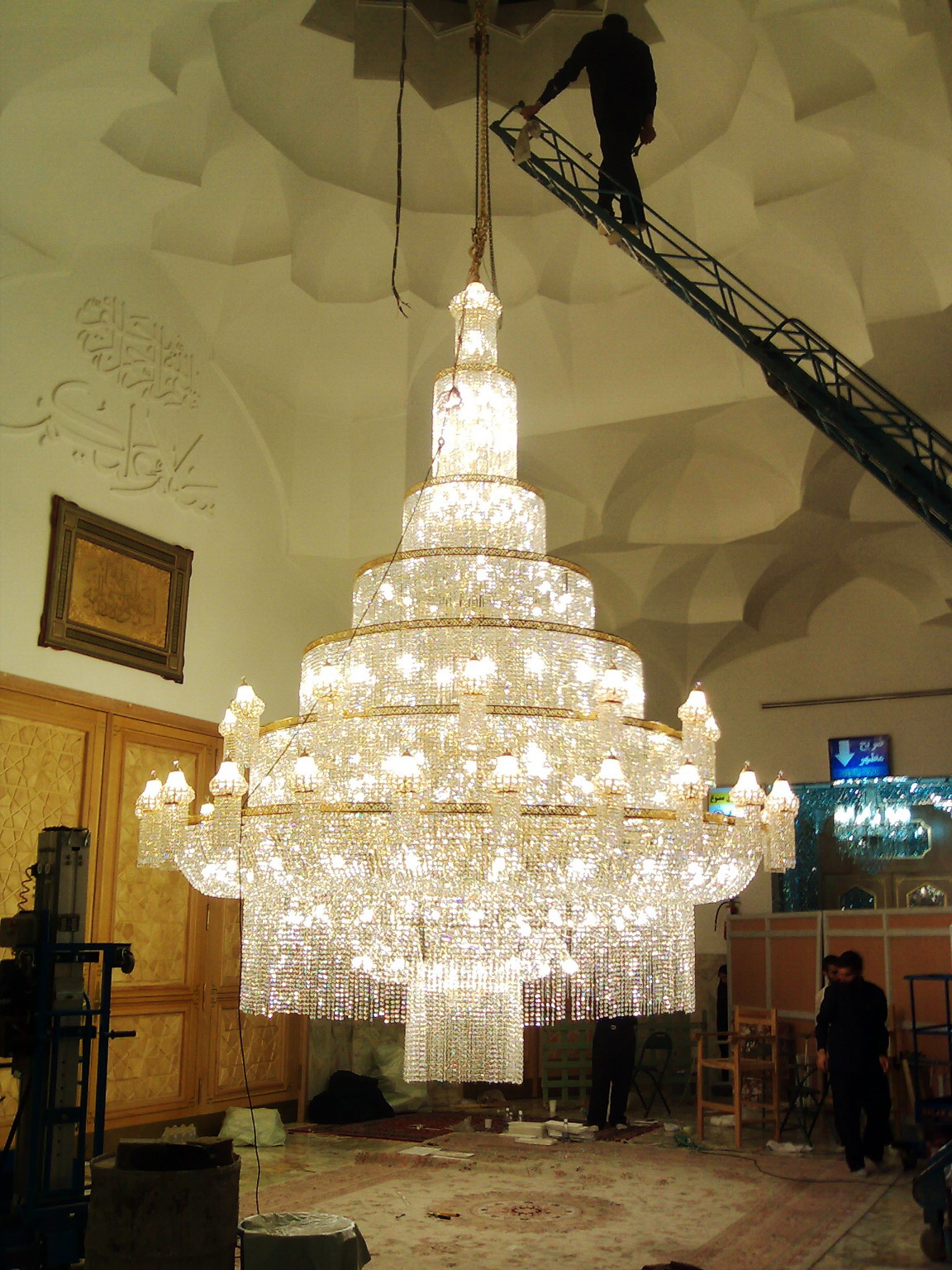
Large modern chandelier being worked on, Iran

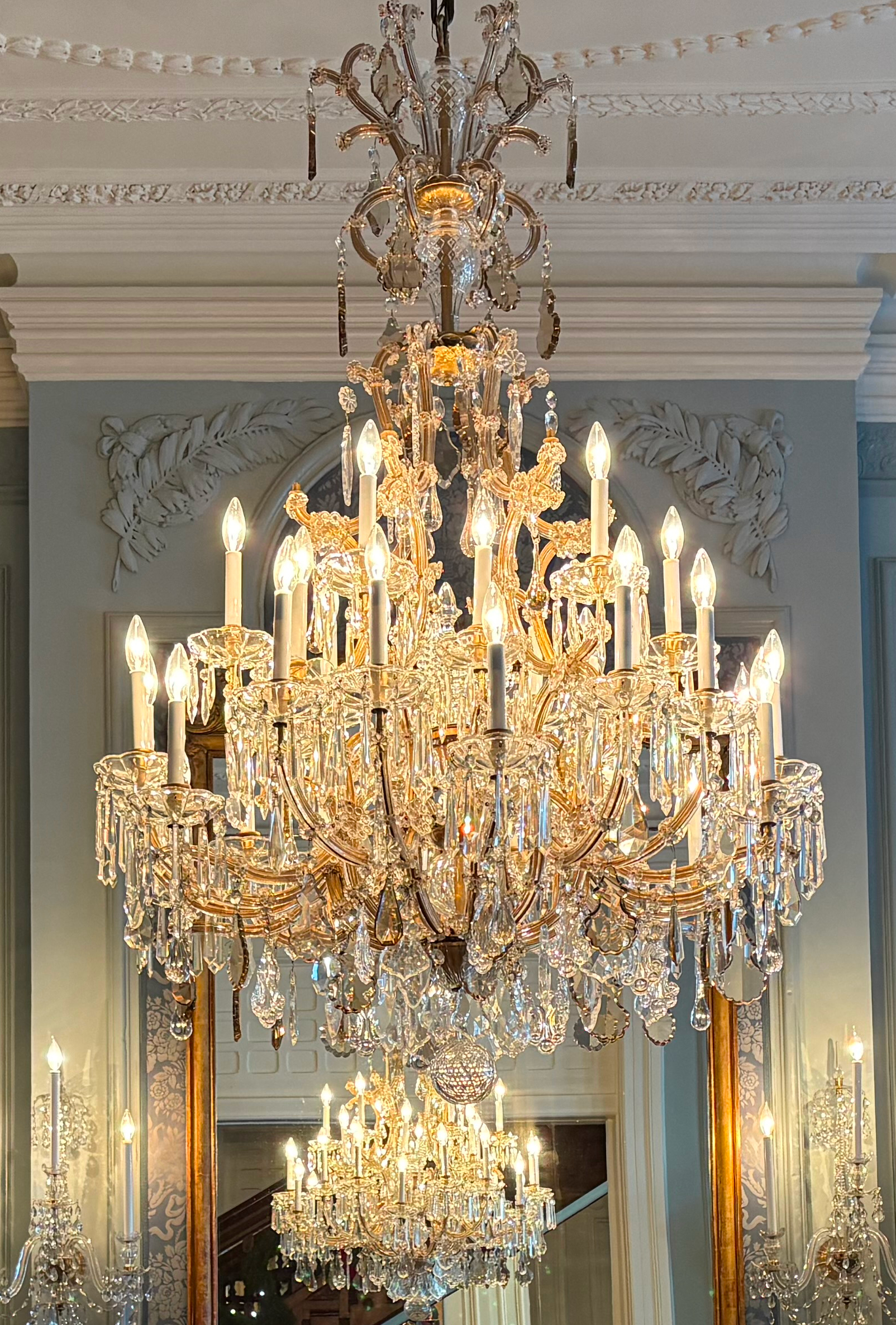
The Strauss chandelier at the North Carolina Executive Mansion, probably Austrian, 19th-century

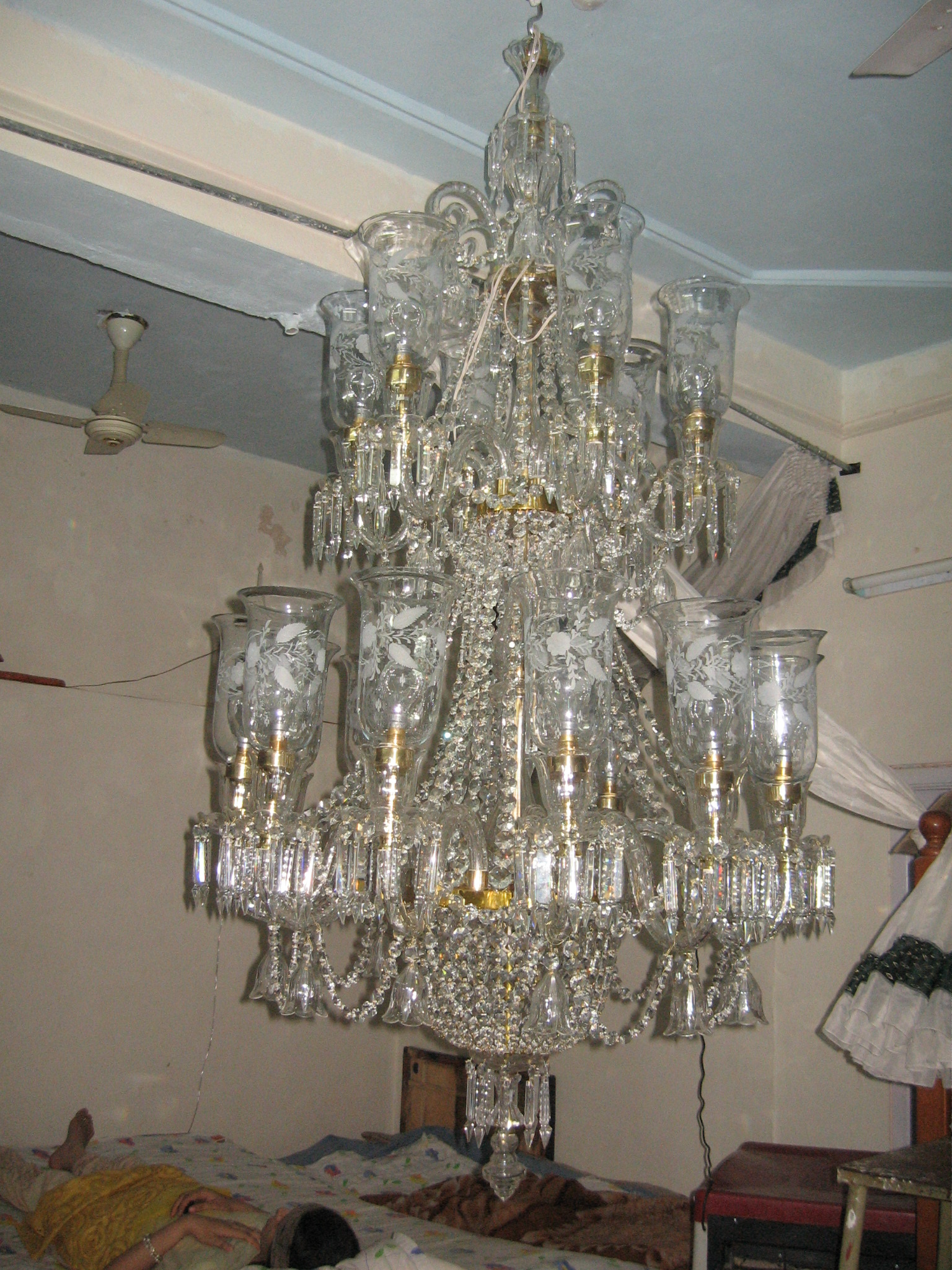
Oddly-sited Victorian chandelier

=== Vessels ===
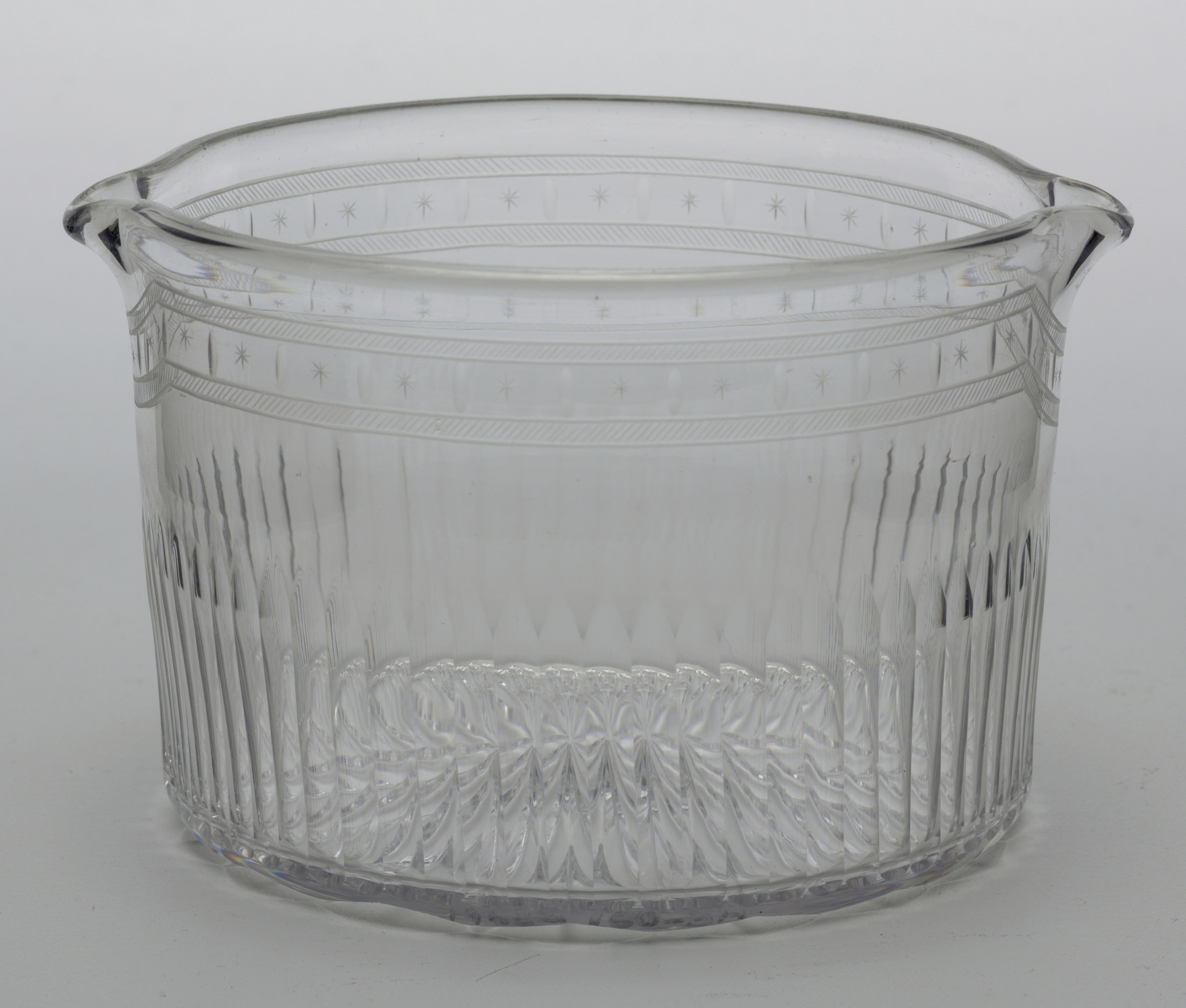
Wine rinser with cut fluting and engraving above, England, late 18th-century

Starting out by decorating mainly wine glasses, decanters and other drinkware, by the 19th century cut glass was used for a variety of tableware shapes, mostly those associated with desserts ("sweetmeat glass" is a term used by collectors), and for bowls and trays either for use at the table or in the drawing room. These larger shapes allowed the room for cutters to produce many of the most interesting and characteristic cut designs, which experts can often date rather precisely, as they passed through several different styles. Starting with the Rococo, there were Neoclassical and Regency styles, and finally one with "Gothic" arches by about 1840. The Regency style added to the 18th-century diamond shapes zones with many parallel bands, furrows, or flutes, either vertical or horizontal, initially rather narrow, but later wider, in the "broad flute" style. From about 1800 to 1840 "almost all British luxury table glass was cut", and the style spread to Europe and North America. English cutters were instructing French workers at the Saint-Louis glass factory by 1781, and later Belgian cutters at Val Saint Lambert by 1826. By 1834, Edo kiriko, a Japanese style of cut glass, was being produced in Edo.

On wine glasses and similar shapes, the rim where the drinker's mouth would touch was left smooth, but the bowl, especially the lower part, the stem, and the foot might be cut. A starburst on the underside of the foot was common. On jugs, cups for eating desserts from, and bowls the rim was often cut with zig-zags or other ornament. Especially in the 18th century, cutting was often combined with glass engraving above, and by the 1840s it was popular to have areas of "frosting", rubbing the glass with abrasives to reduce its transparency.

Competition from cheaper, but lower quality pressed glass in the cut glass style began as early as the 1820s, and grew greatly in the 1830s, but the British cut glass industry continued to expand. In 1845 a commentator stated "cut-glass is now comparatively cheap". The ability of British glass designers to patent their designs after 1842 was a help; the mould makers (often called "die-sinkers" in the trade) were apparently often independent of the glass factories. At least in America, where the cut glass industry was growing rapidly, "cutting shops" were also often, or usually in the 19th century, independent operations buying glass blanks from the glassmakers. In the 1870s Bohemian cutters began to arrive in Corning, New York, one of the centres of the industry, supplementing English immigrants.

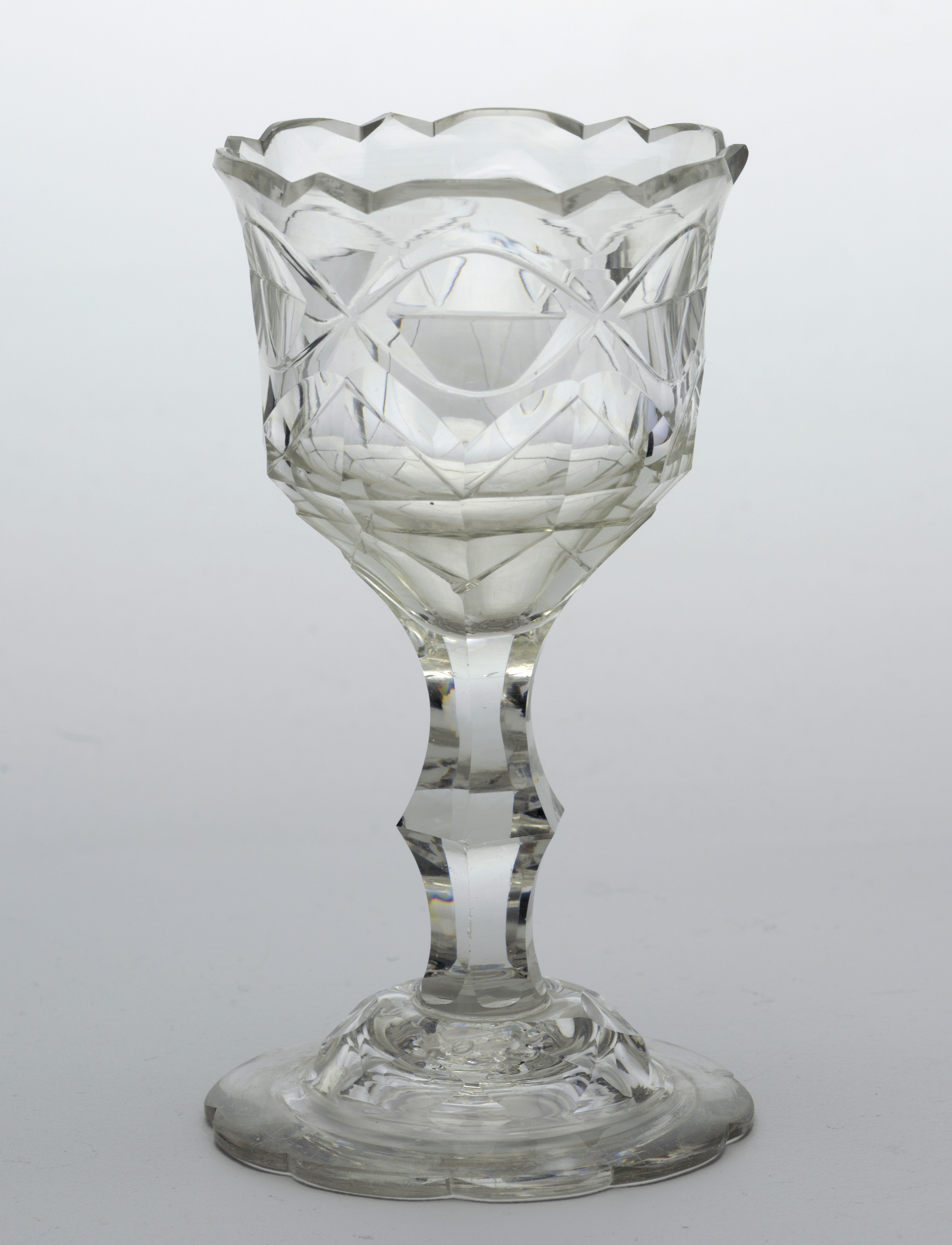
Dessert glass, England, 1760–80

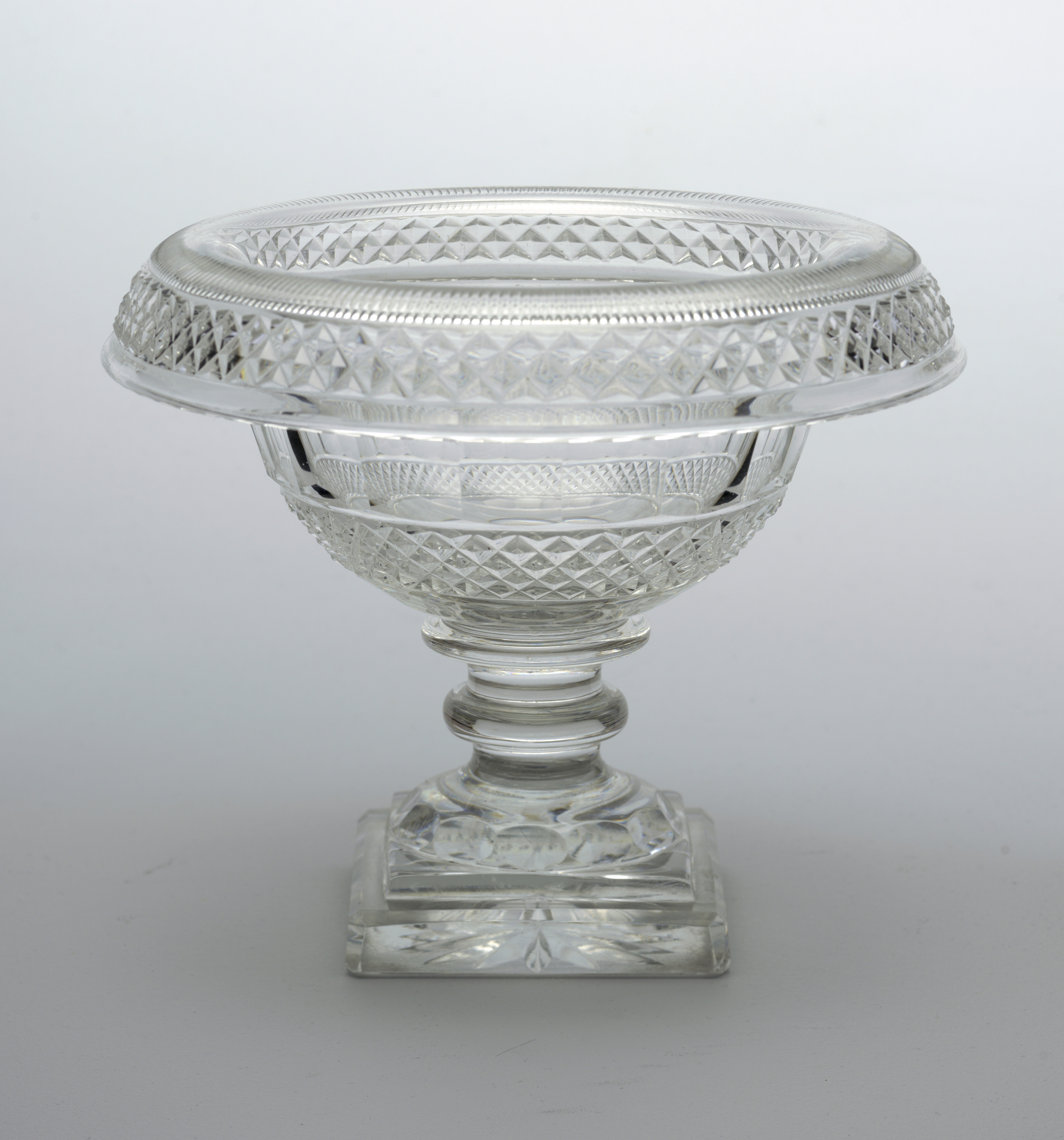
Bowl, 1820–30, English

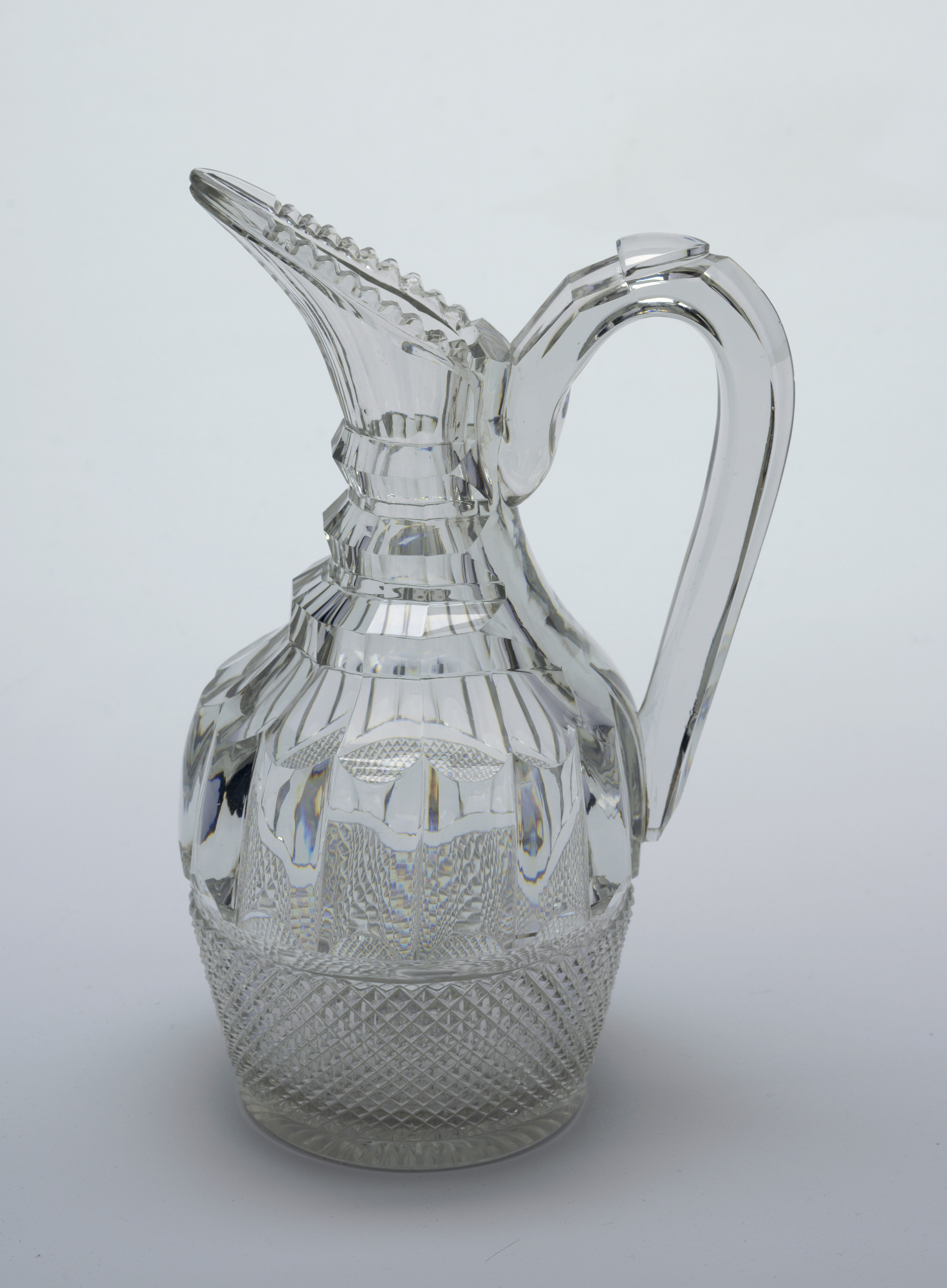
Irish jug, early 19th century

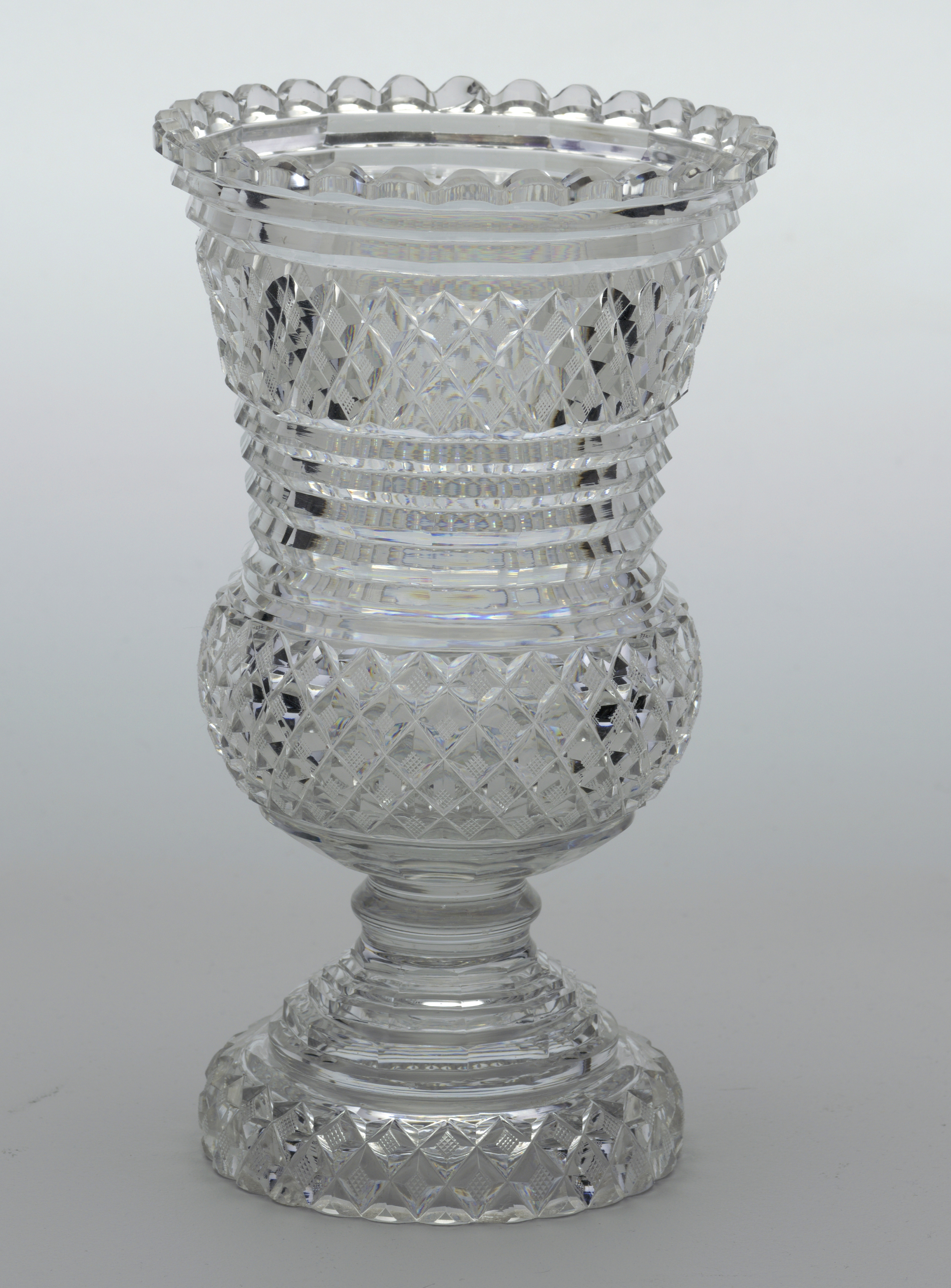
English (?) vase, c. 1835

=== 1850 onwards ===
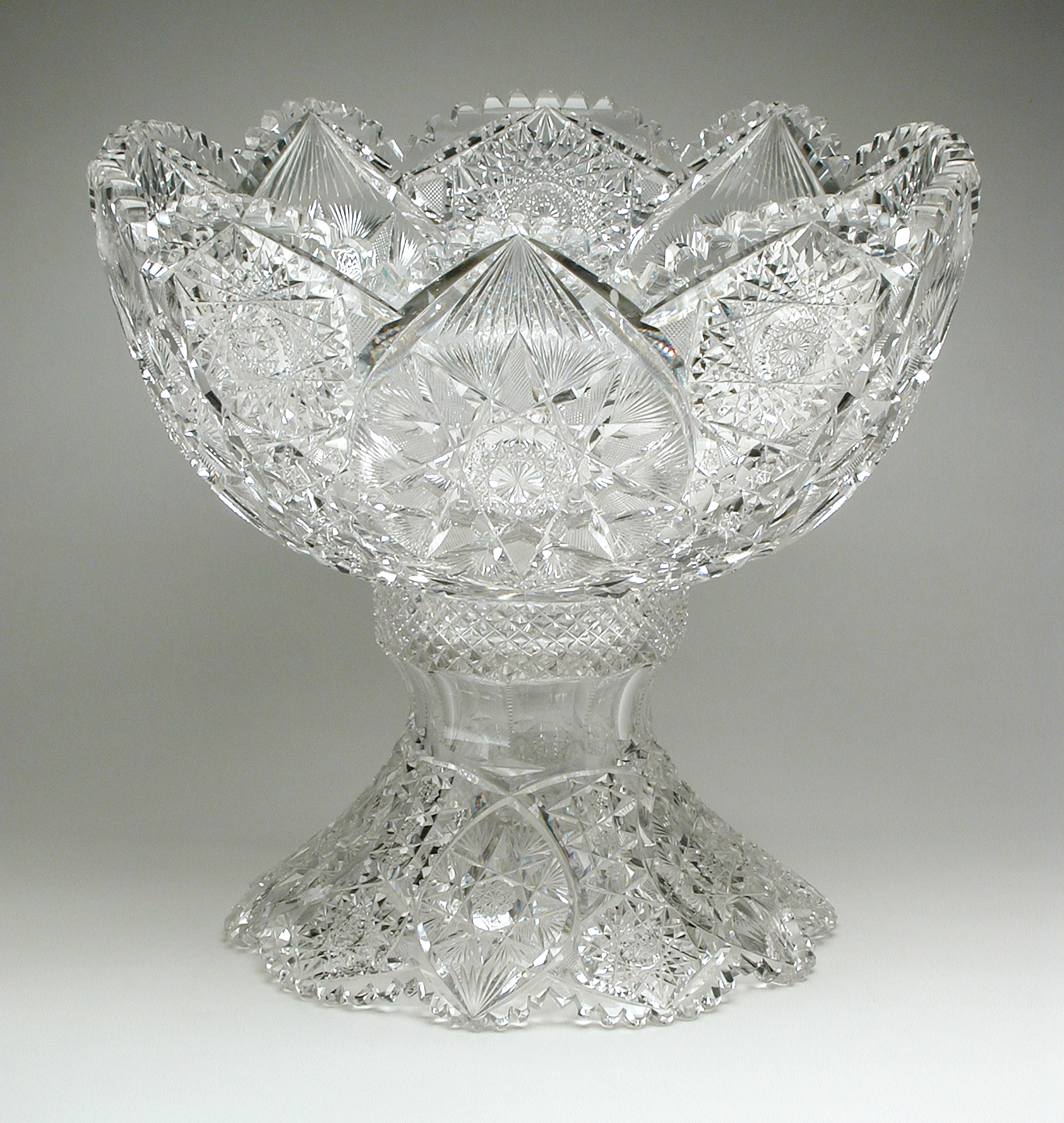
American "brilliant cut" punch bowl on stand, 1895

The centrepiece at the crossing of the Crystal Palace holding the Great Exhibition of 1851 in London was a huge glass fountain (8.25 metres or 27 feet high), including much cut glass, by the leading Birmingham firm of F. & C. Ostler. Cut glass had dominated both its main market niches for several decades, but a number of factors were about to challenge it, at least as far as vessels were concerned. The Victorian taste for over-ornamentation was beginning to take over, and some of the cut glass displayed at the Great Exhibition was described as "prickly monstrosities". In the year of the exhibition, the hugely influential critic John Ruskin, in his Modern Painters, denounced the whole technique, writing "We ought to be ashamed of it" and "all cut glass is barbarous, for the cutting conceals its ductility and confuses it with [rock] crystal".

At the same time, and further stimulated by the Great Exhibition itself, the British style was spreading across the Western world, and in particular cut American and Bohemian glass was attacking the British market. The previous excise duty long charged on glass was abolished in 1845, which both encouraged the development of exciting new styles of decorating glass, and also made glass cheaper, leading to a flood of pressed glass imitations of cut glass style that tended to devalue the prestige of the style. Nonetheless, cut glass remained a staple in most prosperous British households, and was still widely exported.

In the 1870s the "brilliant", "brilliant cut" or "American Brilliant" style emerged, perhaps first seen in America in glass exhibited at the 1876 Philadelphia Centenary Exhibition: "its most complex brilliant cutting involved covering the glass surface with intersecting cuts that created innumerable, often fragmentary shapes making up larger patterns. Basic motifs used were stars, hobnail or polygonal diamonds, strawberry diamonds and fan scallops...".

=== Decline ===
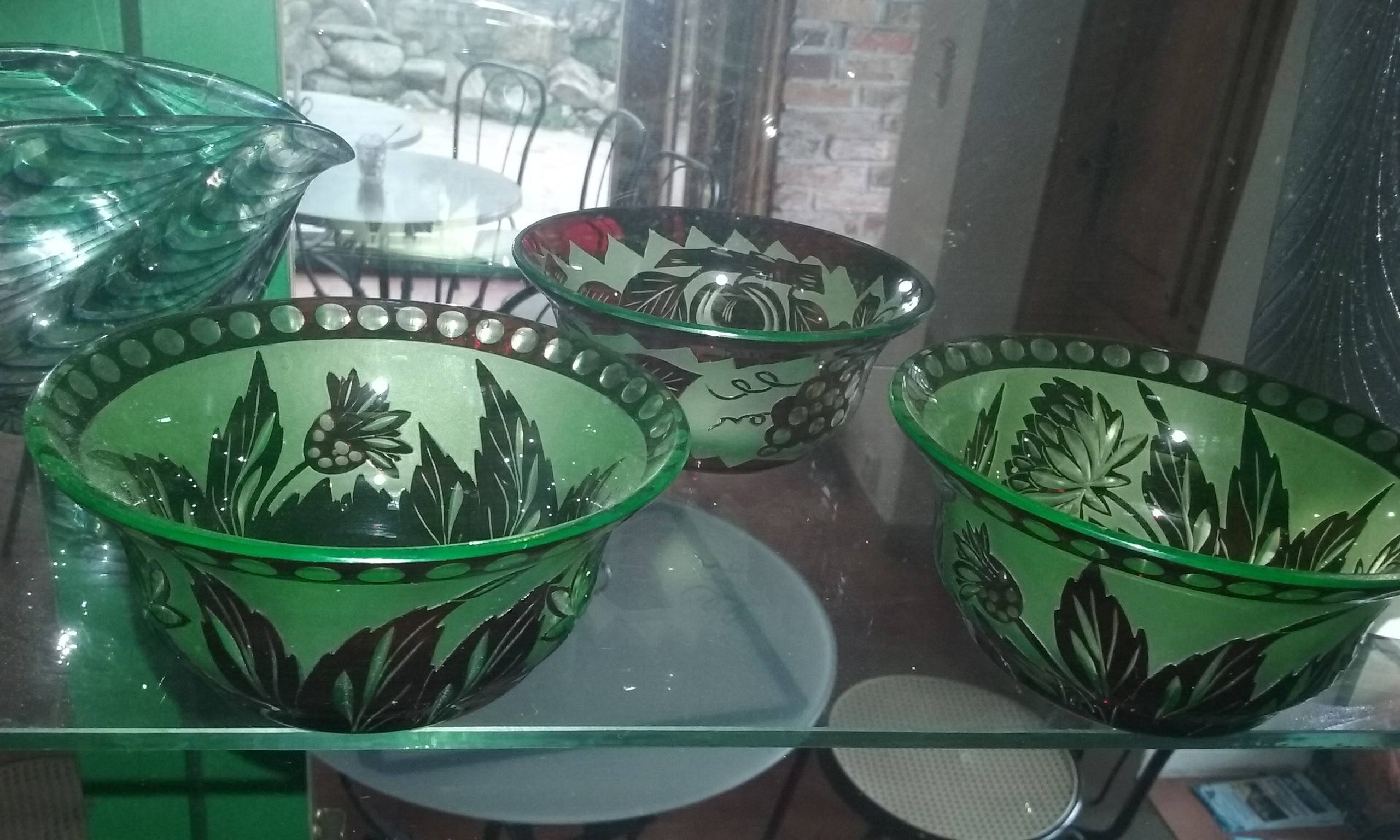
Contemporary Czech cut glass in two colours

The last decades of the 19th century saw exciting new developments in glass design, with much use of colour, the Victorian version of cameo glass using glass etching, opaline glass in France, and other innovations. Cut glass, especially in the brilliant style, did not mix well with these – the great majority of it has always used clear glass. An exception is the distinct Japanese style of Satsuma kiriko, which adds a thin layer of coloured flashed glass which is then cut through, giving a colour contrast. Similar effects were sometimes used in the West, especially in continental Europe. Cut glass vessels remained popular, but an increasingly conventional and conservative taste, little used for art glass, a new term for decorative glass with artistic aspirations. This was even more the case with Art Nouveau glass and that of the Arts and Crafts Movement, which both took on board Ruskin's criticisms, and preferred sinuous curving forms that emphasized the flowing, frozen liquid nature of glass.

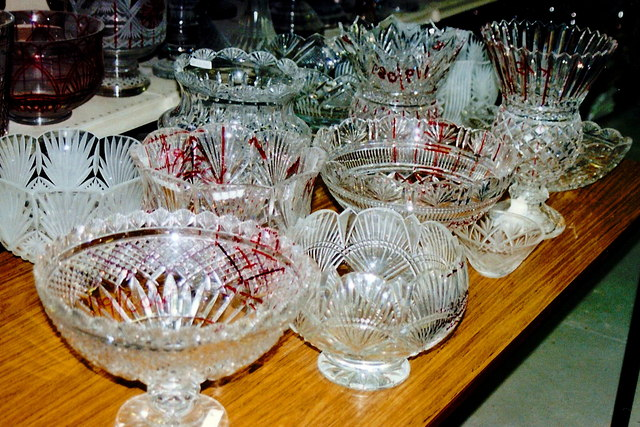
Waterford Crystal factory in 2001

At the end of the century the market for expensive decorative glass appears to have slumped, perhaps because so much was now being made and traded internationally. Corning's cut glass industry peaked in 1905, when a directory recorded 490 cutters there, and 33 engravers, though the quality of some work was falling; by 1909 the number of cutters had fallen to 340.

The arrival of Modernism in the early 20th century did not do much to change this, and in 1923 an English expert complained that "to the aesthetic soul [cut glass] is still a thing accursed ... a striking testimony to the persistence of Ruskin's influence". He tried to do a survey of likely owners of 18th-century cut glass such as historic houses, Oxbridge colleges and London livery companies, but found very few would admit to owning any.

But some glassmakers, for example in Art Deco, were sympathetic to linear and geometric decoration and made use of the technique, often as one of a number of techniques used in a single piece. This continues to be the case in the recent studio glass movement. In mid-20th-century England there was a revival in engraved glass, which was often accompanied by some cutting; the work of Keith Murray includes examples. Traditional cut glass designs are still used, for example in what Americans call the Old fashioned glass, a whisky or cocktail tumbler. In chandeliers, however, the clear cut glass style has been adapted successfully to modern styles and still holds its own, especially for large public spaces such as hotel lobbies.

== Cut-glass accent ==
In British English, a "cut-glass accent" is an especially clipped version of British upper-class Received Pronunciation, where "words are pronounced very clearly and carefully". The accent is agreed to be less common now than it was several decades ago, with even leading exponents such as Queen Elizabeth II having softened their pronunciation over the years.
