= Villa Majorelle =

House of Louis Majorelle in Nancy, France

Coordinates: 48.6855°N 6.1639°E

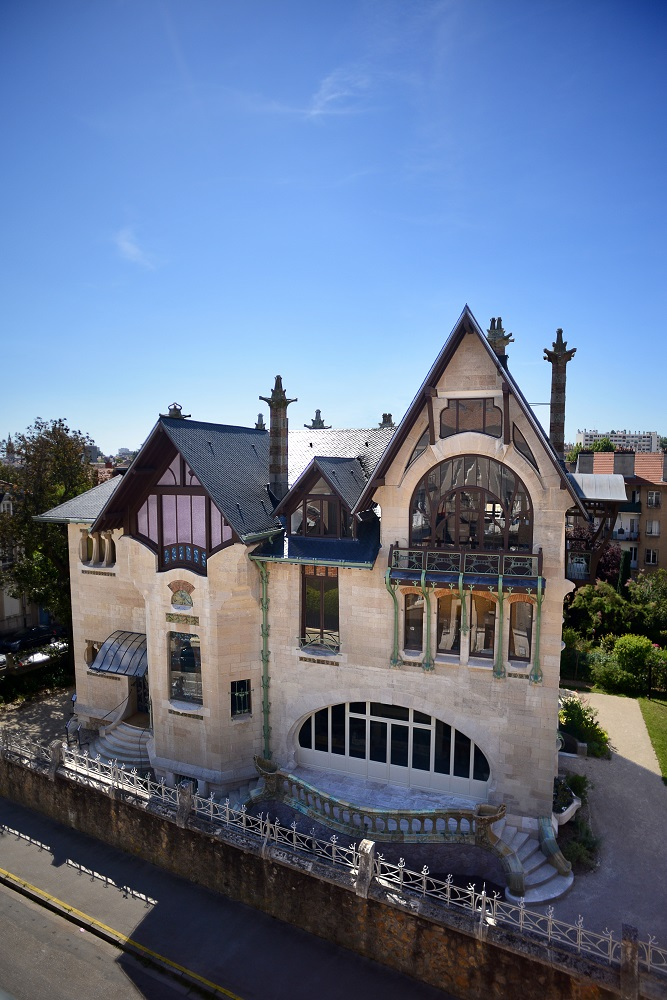
North facade of Villa Majorelle after renovation in 2020

The Villa Majorelle is a house located at 1 rue Louis-Majorelle in the city of Nancy, France, which was the home and studio of the furniture designer Louis Majorelle. It was designed and built by the architect Henri Sauvage in 1901-1902. The villa is one of the first and most influential examples of the Art Nouveau architectural style in France. It served as a showcase for Majorelle's furniture and the work of other noted decorative artists of the period, including ceramist Alexandre Bigot and stained glass artist Jacques Gruber. It is now owned by the city of Nancy, and is open to the public certain days for tours by reservation.

== History ==
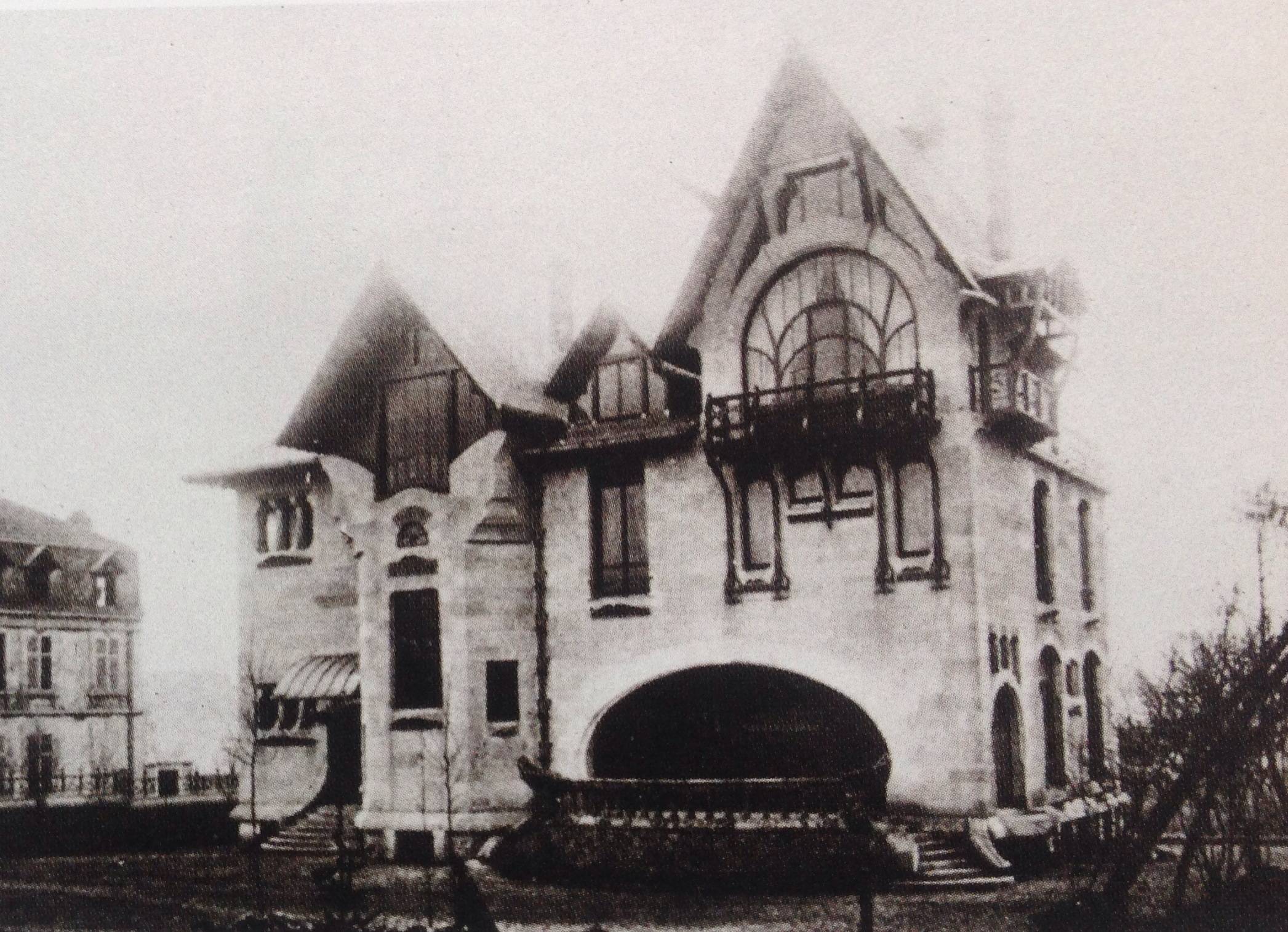
North facade of Villa Majorelle in 1904

The house was commissioned by Louis Majorelle (1859-1926), a Nancy furniture designer and manufacturer. His father, Auguste Majorelle, a craftsman who made fine lacquered furniture, had begun the family firm in Nancy in 1860, making and selling finely crafted lacquered furniture, and had been awarded prizes and achieved an international reputation for his work at the Paris Universal Exposition of 1878. His son Louis also planned an artistic career, and entered the course of painting at the Ecole des Beaux-Arts in Paris in 1877, when he was only eighteen. His father died two years later, and Louis took over the family firm.

At the time that Louis took over the firm, Nancy was growing rapidly, due largely to the arrival of thousands of French residents of Alsace and parts of Lorraine who left their homes after they became part of Germany following the 1870 Franco-Prussian War. The city grew from 50,000 inhabitants in 1872 to 120,000 in 1911. Many of the new arrivals were prosperous, and they wanted fine furniture for their new homes. Louis Majorelle decided to expand the workshops of the firm, then located in the southern part of Nancy. In 1897 he bought a parcel of 3500 square meters in what was then a rural area west of the city, and built a new factory there. He then planned the construction of his new residence close to the factory, a common practice in that period.

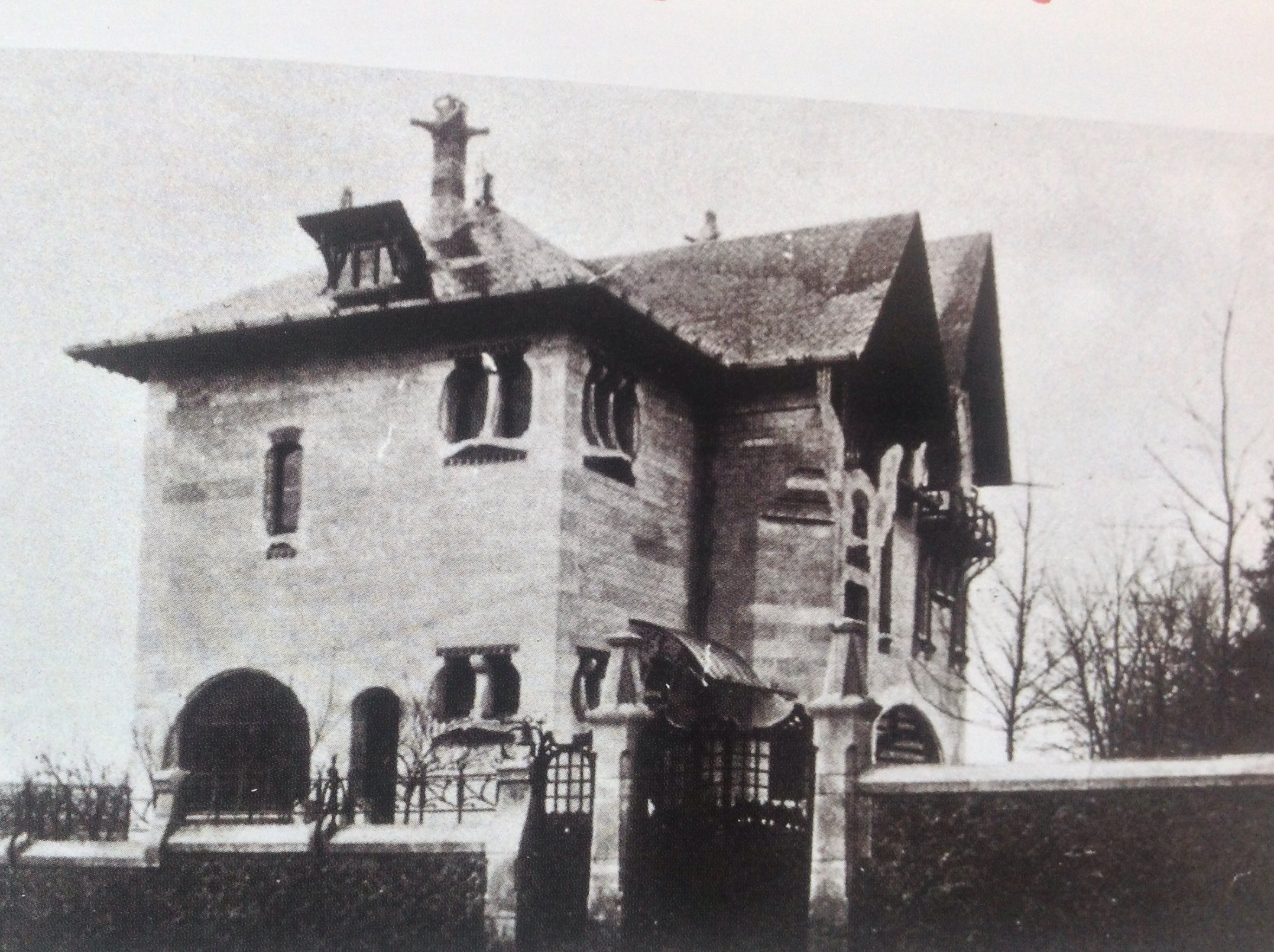
East facade of Villa Majorelle in 1904

To design his house, Louis chose a young architect recommended by his friends from the Ecole des Beaux Arts; Henri Sauvage, who was only twenty-four. The Villa was his first project. Sauvage was assisted by Lucien Weissenburger (1860-1929), who had designed the nearby factory. Weissenburger went on to design many prominent art nouveau buildings in Nancy, in what became known as the school of Nancy. Majorelle also maintained close relations with artists he had known at the Ecole des Beaux-Arts, including the sculptor Alexandre Charpentier (1856-1909) and the painter Francis Jourdain (1876-1958), who collaborated with him on furniture and participated in the decoration of the villa.

When the house was completed in 1902, Majorelle assured that it was widely publicized as an advertisement for his firm and his art. An article in the Paris magazine L'Illustration, accompanied by photographs and plans of the house, described it as "A house made by an artist for an artist" and the summit of modernity. The writer assured the public that the house offered fantasy that was always logical, a sense of comfort, and well-reasoned simplicity. His only criticism concerned the large number of chimneys, which he thought was excessive. Another article by Louis Charles Boileau appeared in the professional journal L'Architecture, which described the house as "a search for a new art pushed here very far; in the construction of a beautiful work..." This was followed by articles in the popular magazines Art et Décoration and l'Art Decoratif by the architect Frantz Jourdain, designer of the department store Le Samaritaine in Paris, which stated that the villa had broken away from reminiscence about the past, replacing it with "art adopted to the realities of life."

The success of the Villa opened an important career for Henri Sauvage. He was commissioned by Majorelle to build a new store in Paris for Majorelle's firm, at a site on Rue de Provence which had previously been the site of the shop L'Art Nouveau of art dealer Siegfried Bing. Sauvage was immediately commissioned to design the decoration of the Café de Paris, and then became one of the pioneers of the Art Deco style in Paris.

Majorelle established his studio on the top floor of the building, with a view of the countryside. He called the house the Villa Jitka, after his wife. At the time of its construction, the house was surrounded by a park of 3.5 hectares, including a one hectare garden in front of the house, a garden the size of Place Stanislaus, the main square of Nancy. Not long after the construction, Majorelle made modifications to the house. Sauvage had designed a terrace in front of the house, with a ceramic railing by Alexandre Bigot, with a large curved opening extending the terrace into the interior of the building. The interior terrace proved unsuitable in cold weather, and Majorelle had the curved entry replaced by a new room with windows. The beginning of the First World War in August 1914 marked the end of the era of the Art Nouveau, and greatly reduced the business of Majorelle. The furniture factory caught fire and burned in 1916, and in the same year the house and his shop in Nancy were badly damaged by a German aerial bombardment. Majorelle spent most of his time in Paris, using the workshops and factories of his friends.

Majorelle died in Nancy in 1926. After his death, his family could no longer afford to live in the Villa Majorelle, and the house and much of the outlying property were sold off in parcels. Majorelle's factories closed in 1931. The park that surrounded was reduced to a small piece around the house. Majorelle's son, a painter, was in poor health, and decided to move to Marrakesh in Morocco, and took much of the furniture of the house with him. The house was sold to the Department of Highways and Bridges of the French government, and was used as offices, while the interior was considerably modified. The house was not declared a historical monument until January 1975. In November 1996, the property reclassified as a "national patrimony of the 20th century." The house was acquired by the city, only a few rooms still as they were in 1902, and only one is furnished. Much of the house is still used for offices by local organizations. The house today is supported by the city and by Association des Amis du Musée de l'École de Nancy.

== Facades ==
The north, and principal facade of the house, was composed of three distinct blocks of different sizes, whose decoration clearly expressed their function. The block to the right, on the western side of the house, was crowned by the studio of Majorelle, with large windows overlooking what was then the garden. On the first floor were the three bedrooms of the house, and a small salon for Madame Majorelle. The master bedroom was on the south facade, and had its own balcony. On the ground floor, this block contained a combination of dining room and smoking room, just under the master bedroom, and the main salon. The salon originally opened through a curved archway onto the terrace, which had a ceramic balustrade and ceramic plaques by the ceramist Alexandre Bigot, whose work also decorated the best-known art nouveau houses in Paris, the Castel Béranger designed by Hector Guimard and the Lavirotte Building by Jules Lavirotte.of different sizes which clearly expressed their function. The block on the right was crowned with the large window and balcony of the studio of Majorelle.

In the center of the facade, at a lower height than the right block but standing ahead of it, is the portion of the building housing the staircase, expressed by its large windows. Behind the stairway on the ground floor was the vestibule, leading to the dining room/smoking room and salon. Madame Majorelle on the southwest corner. The main bedroom was on the south side of the house, and had a large terrace.

On the left, or eastern side of the house, was a third block, which was set back and had smaller windows. It contained the service functions of the house; the entry hall; the servants entrance; the kitchen and office; and the entrance to the cellar. On the first floor were the main bathroom and toilets, and on the top floor was a maid's bedroom.

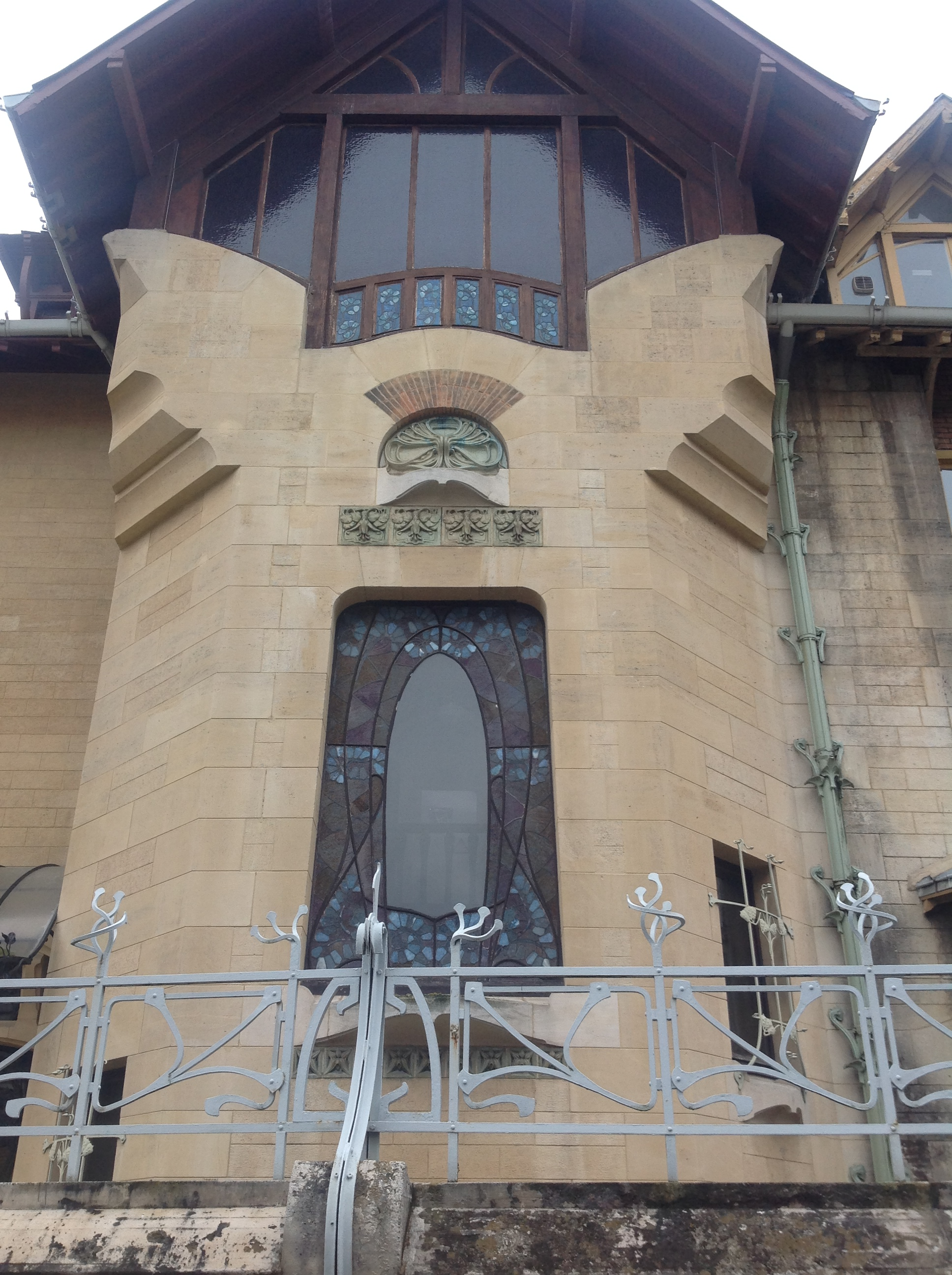
Facade of the stairway

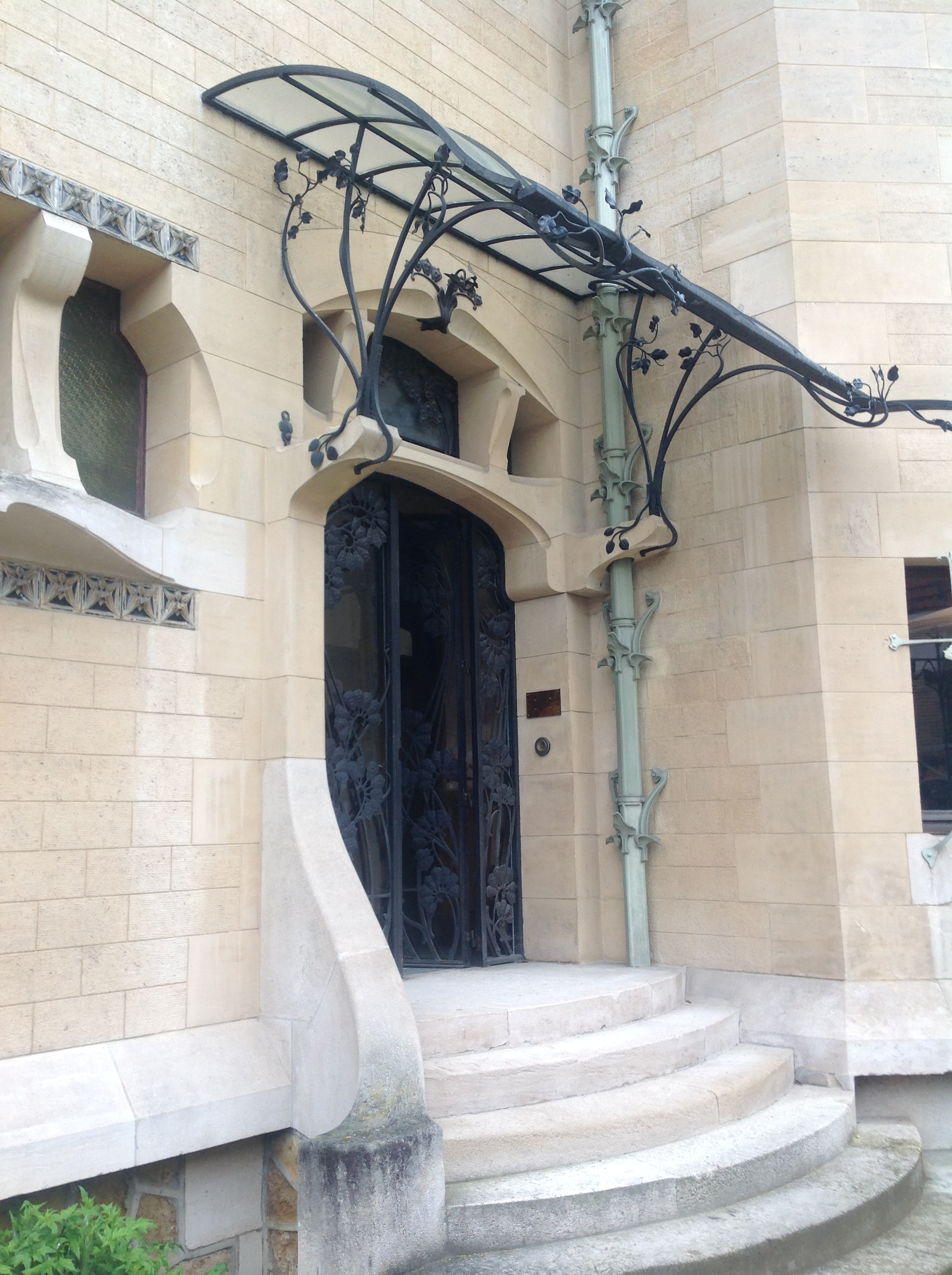
Entry to Villa Majorelle

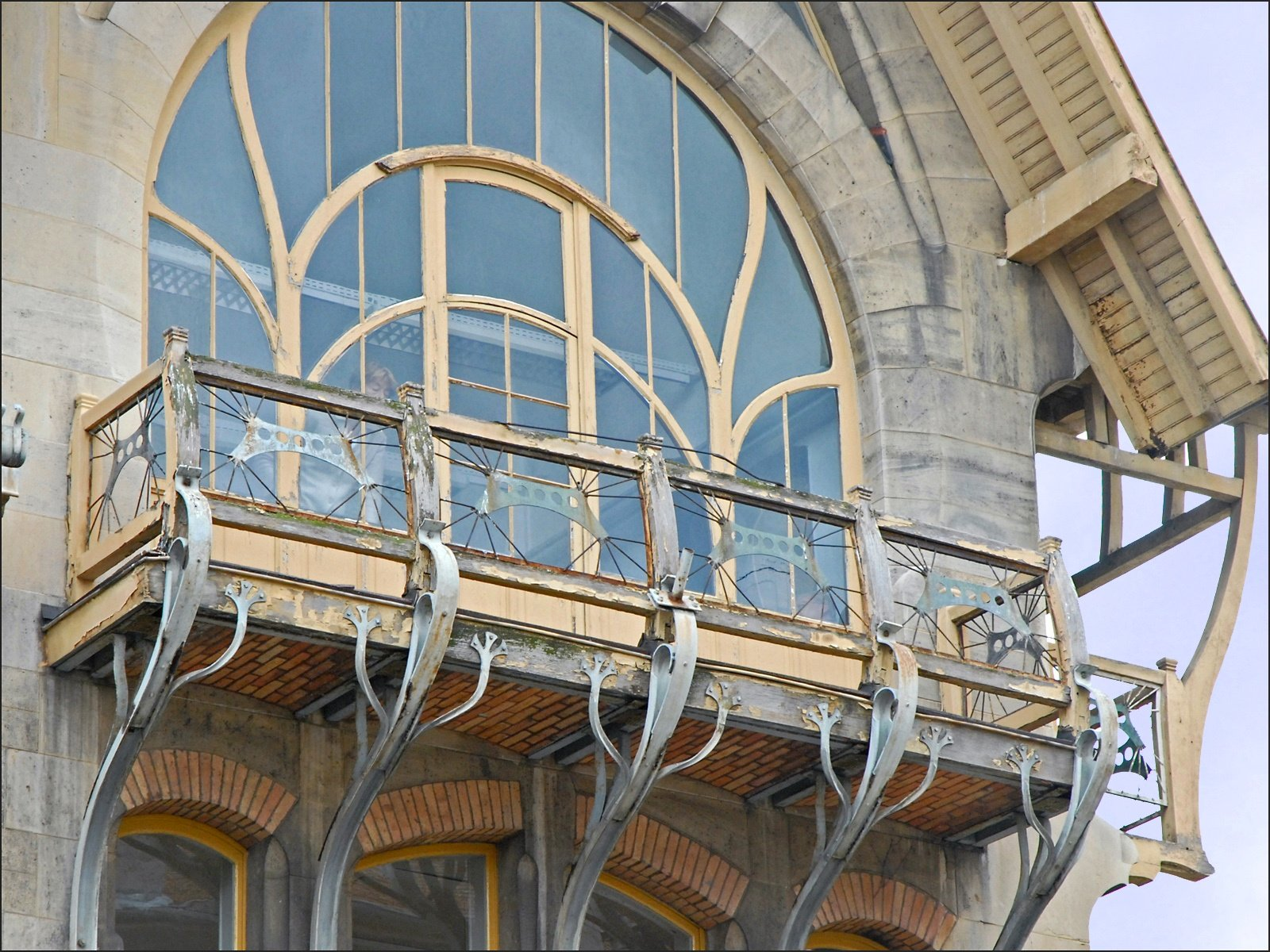
Window of the studio of Louis Majorelle

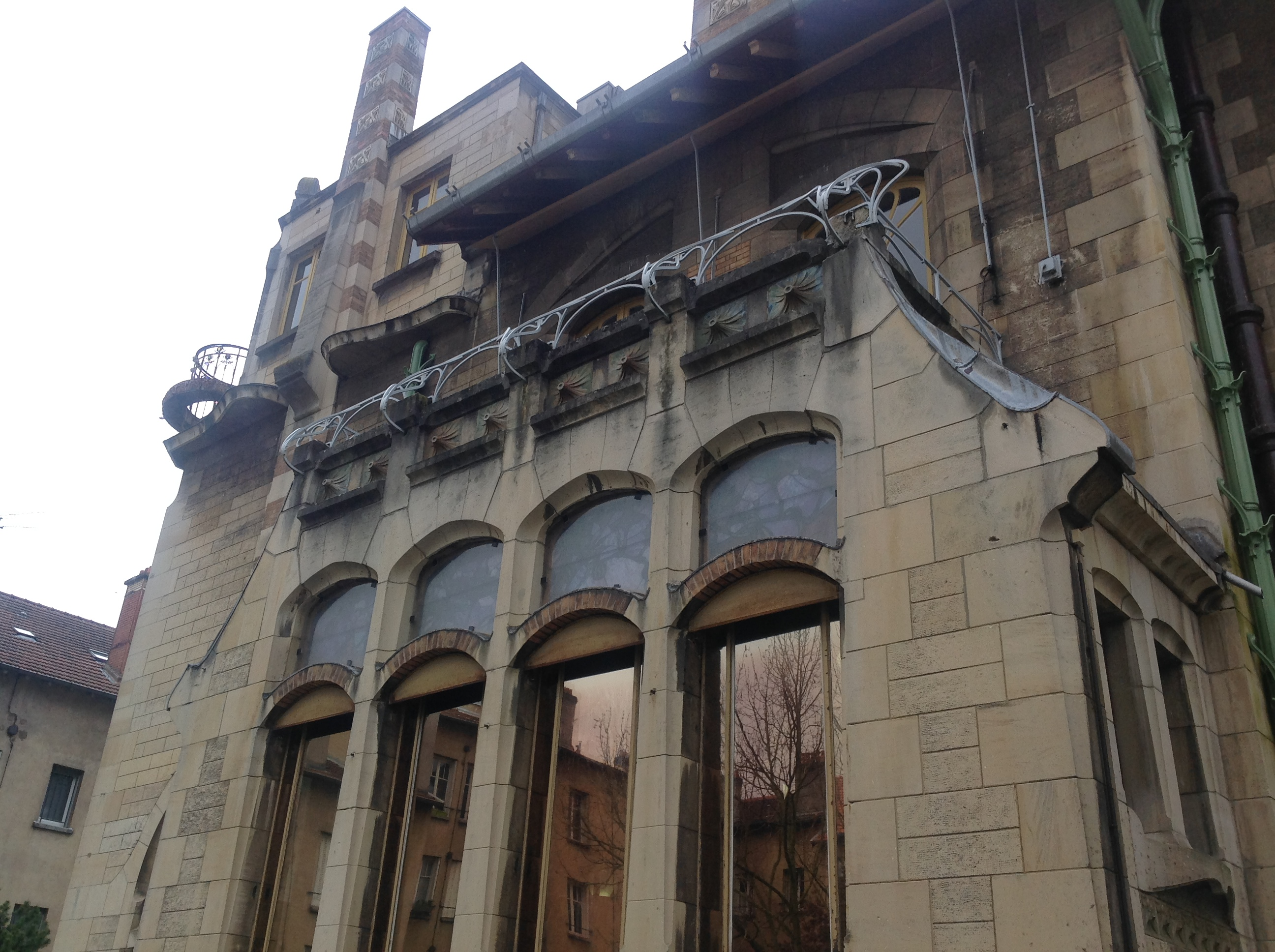
The rear facade, with dining room windows below and bedroom terrace above

== Exterior decoration ==
The outside of the villa featured an abundance of decoration in ceramic, metal and wood, each work unique but harmonious with the style of the building. The service entrance, on the east facade, was given an art nouveau doorway and decorative porch. Even the drainpipes and chimneys were given an art nouveau touch, with trim in vegetal forms, and thus became part of the decoration. Much of the work was by the Paris ceramic manufacturer Alexandre Bigot, who had achieved fame for the lavish facade of the Lavirotte Building in Paris, finished in 1901.

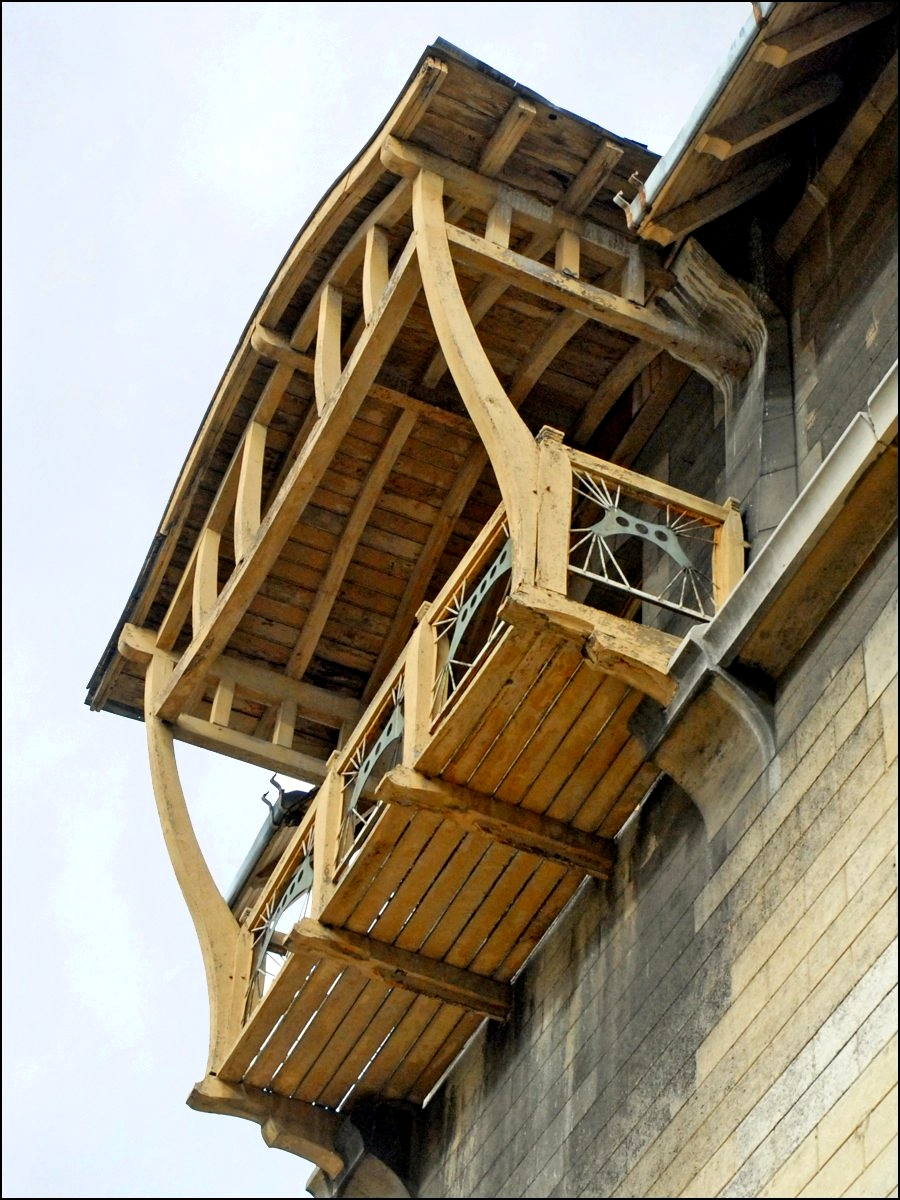
Loggia on the west facade, outside Majorelle's studio

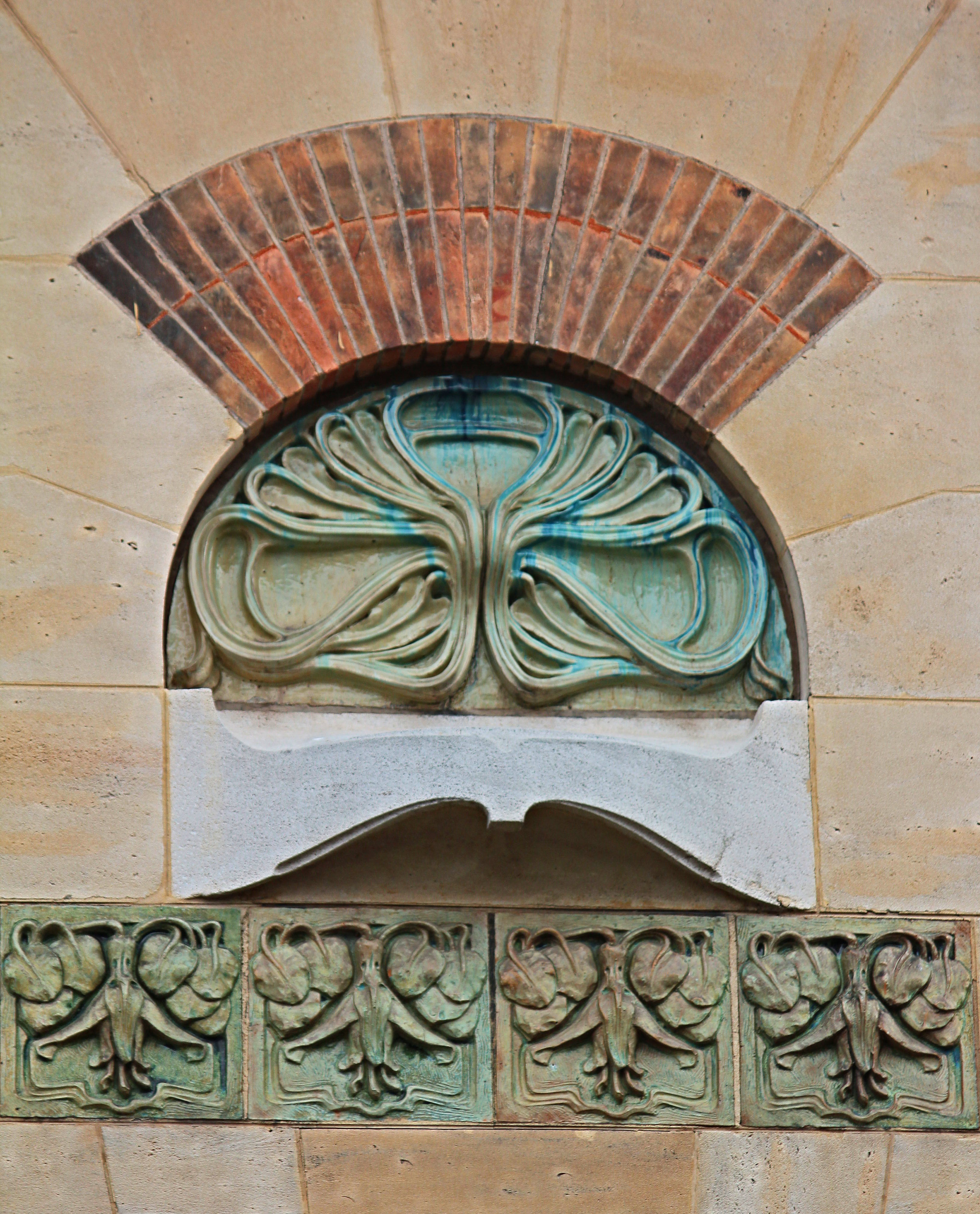
ceramic wall decoration by Alexandre Bigot

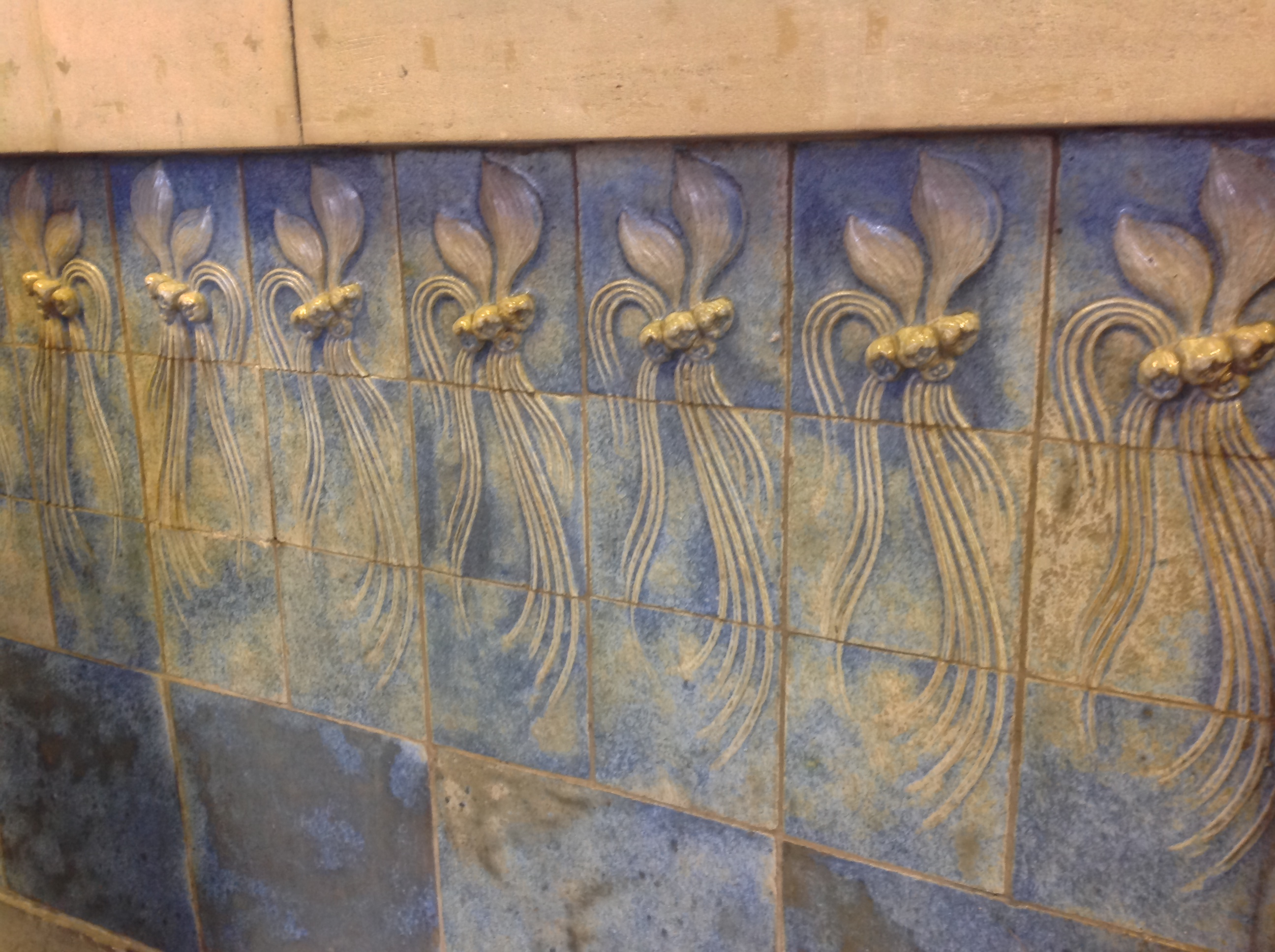
Ceramic panel on the terrace (now enclosed) by Alexandre Bigot

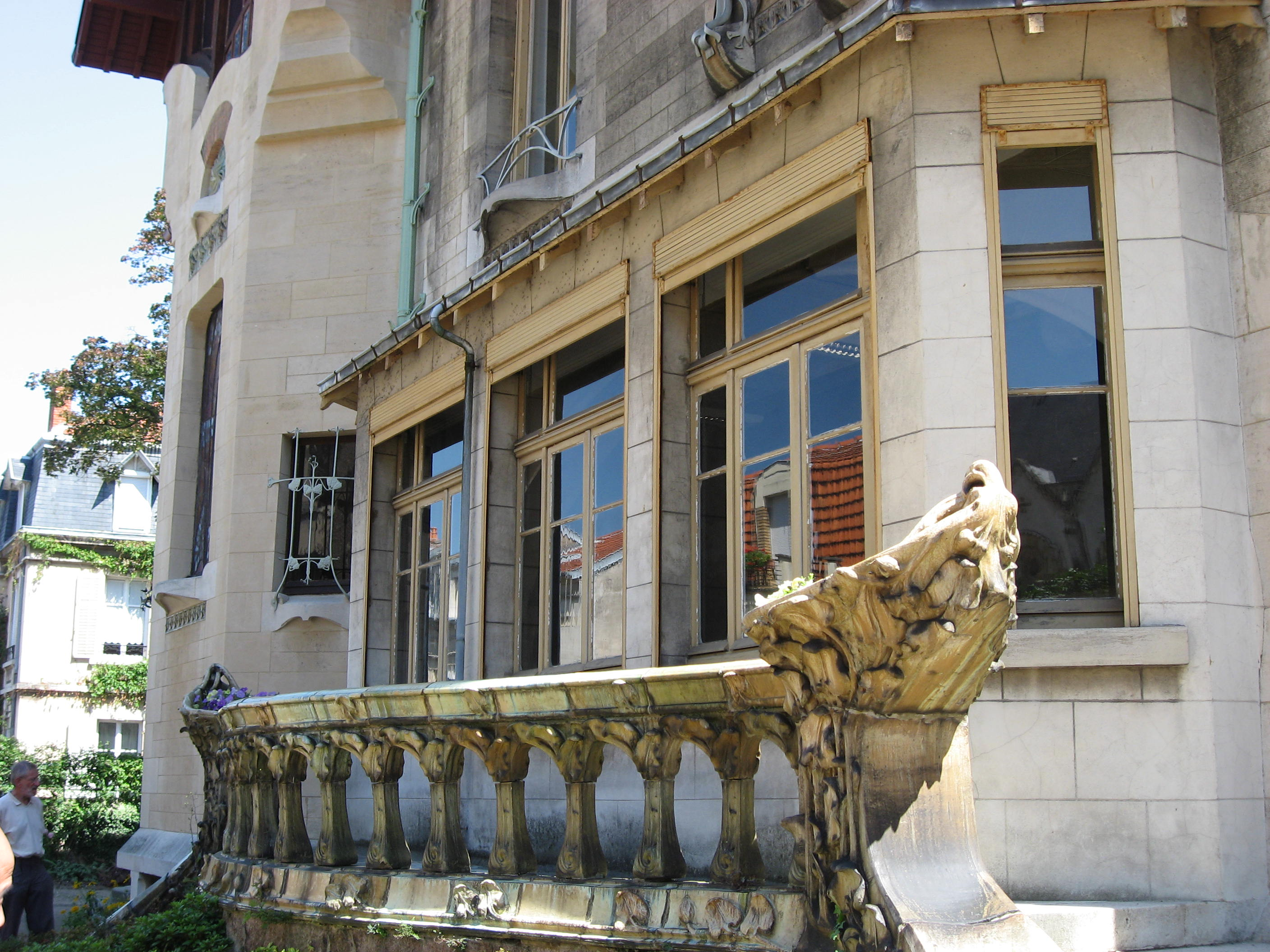
Ceramic terrace balustrade by Alexandre Bigot

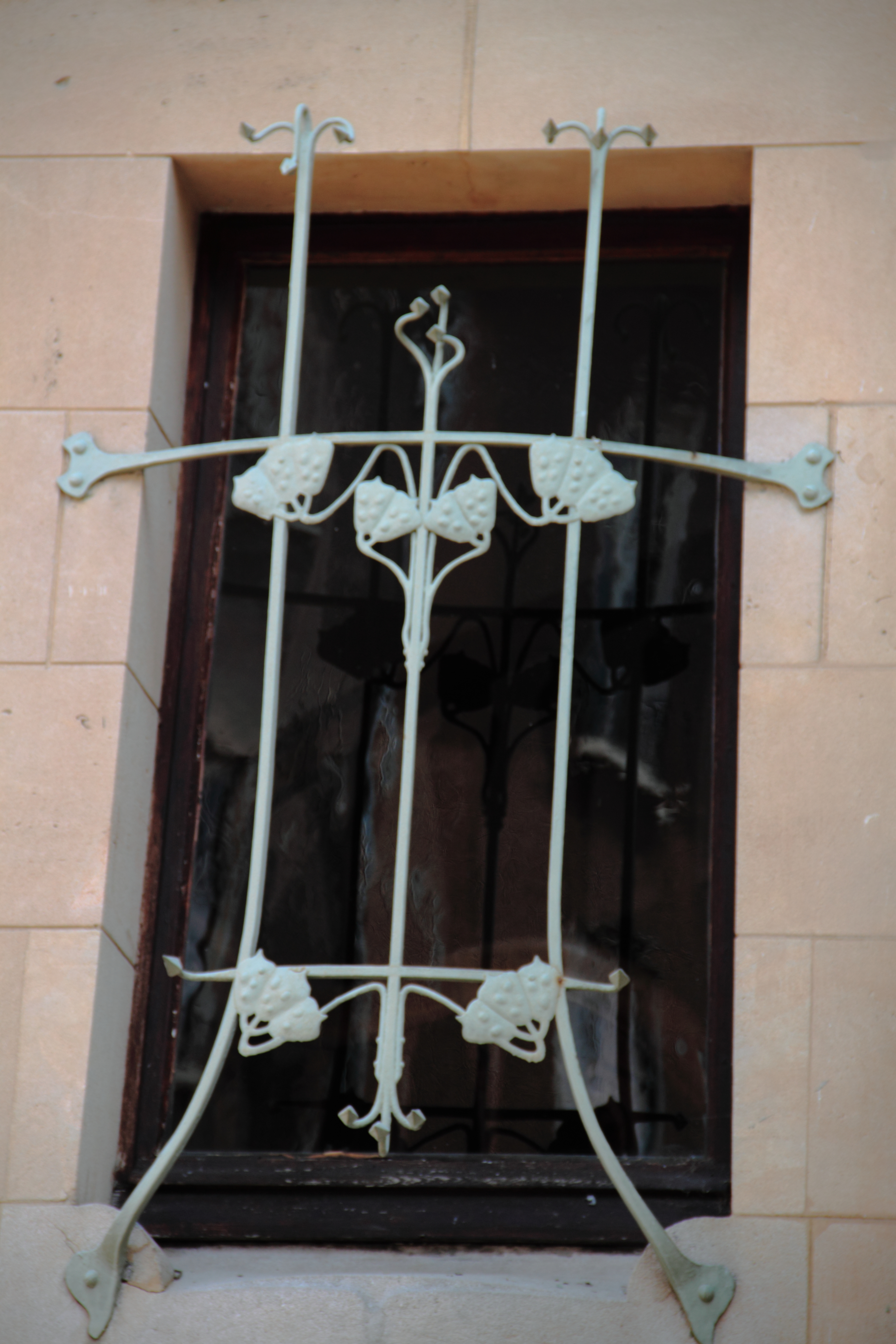
Window grille

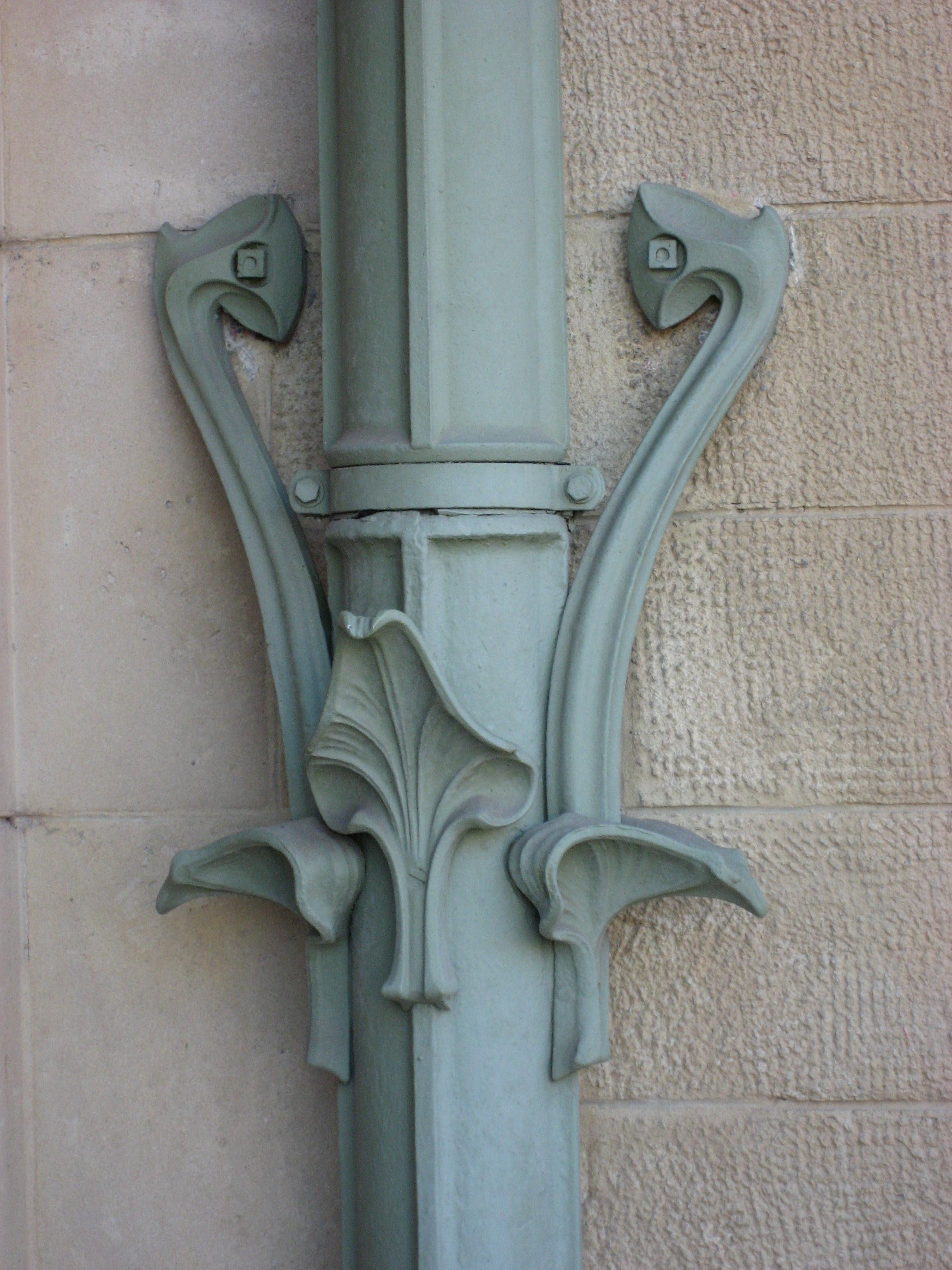
Drainpipe with vegetal form

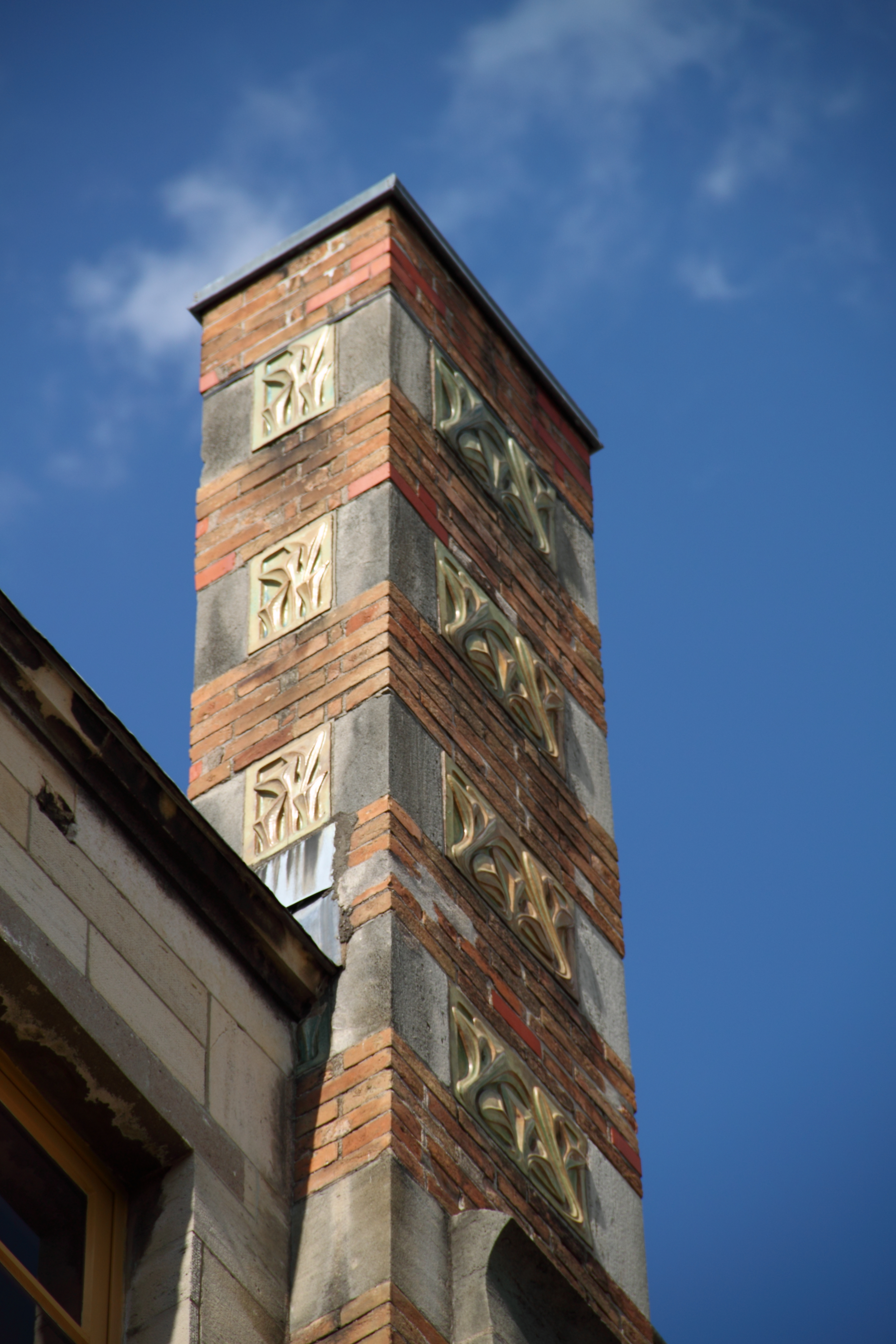
Chimney with ceramic decoration

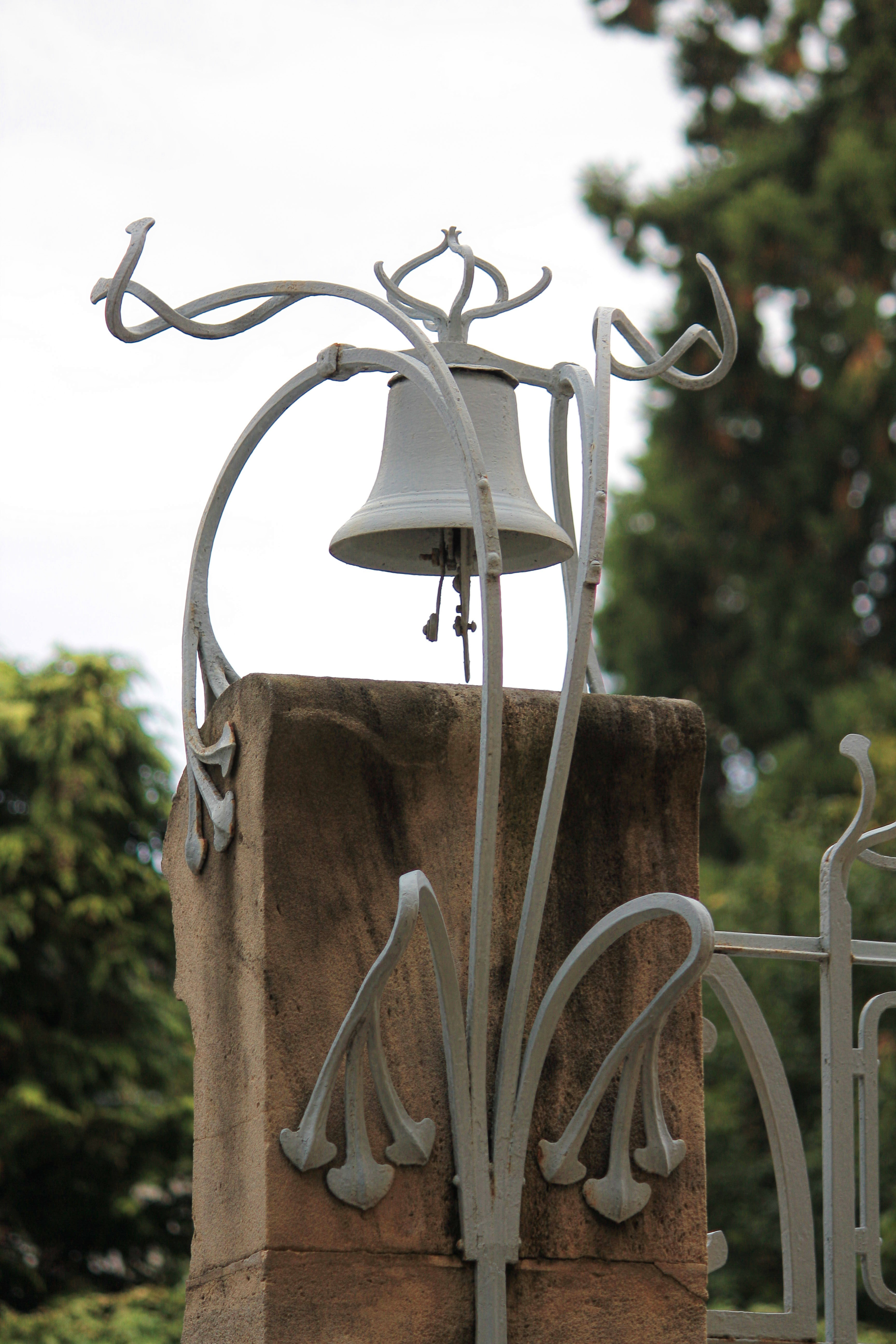
Bell on the front gate

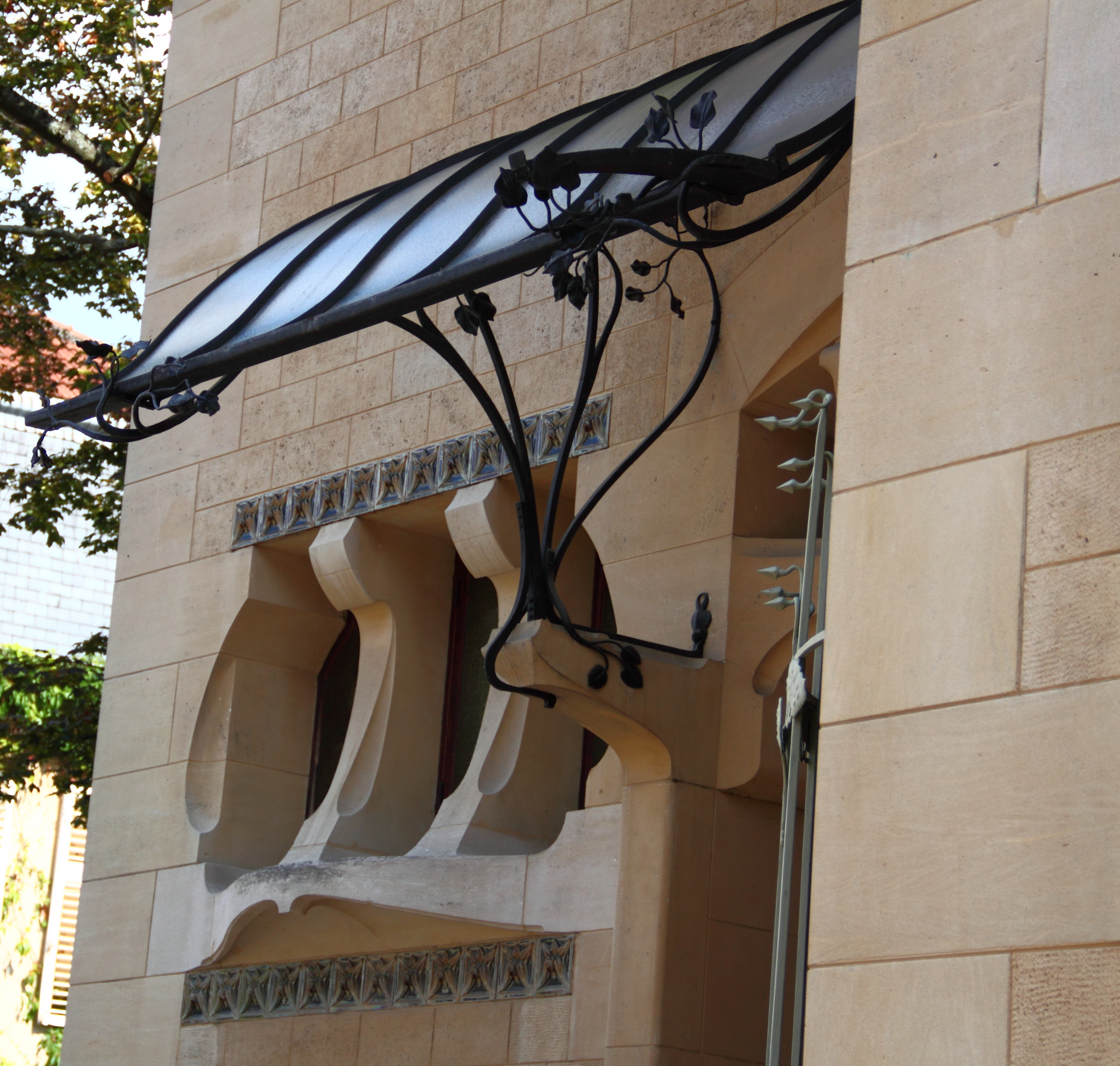
Porch decoration

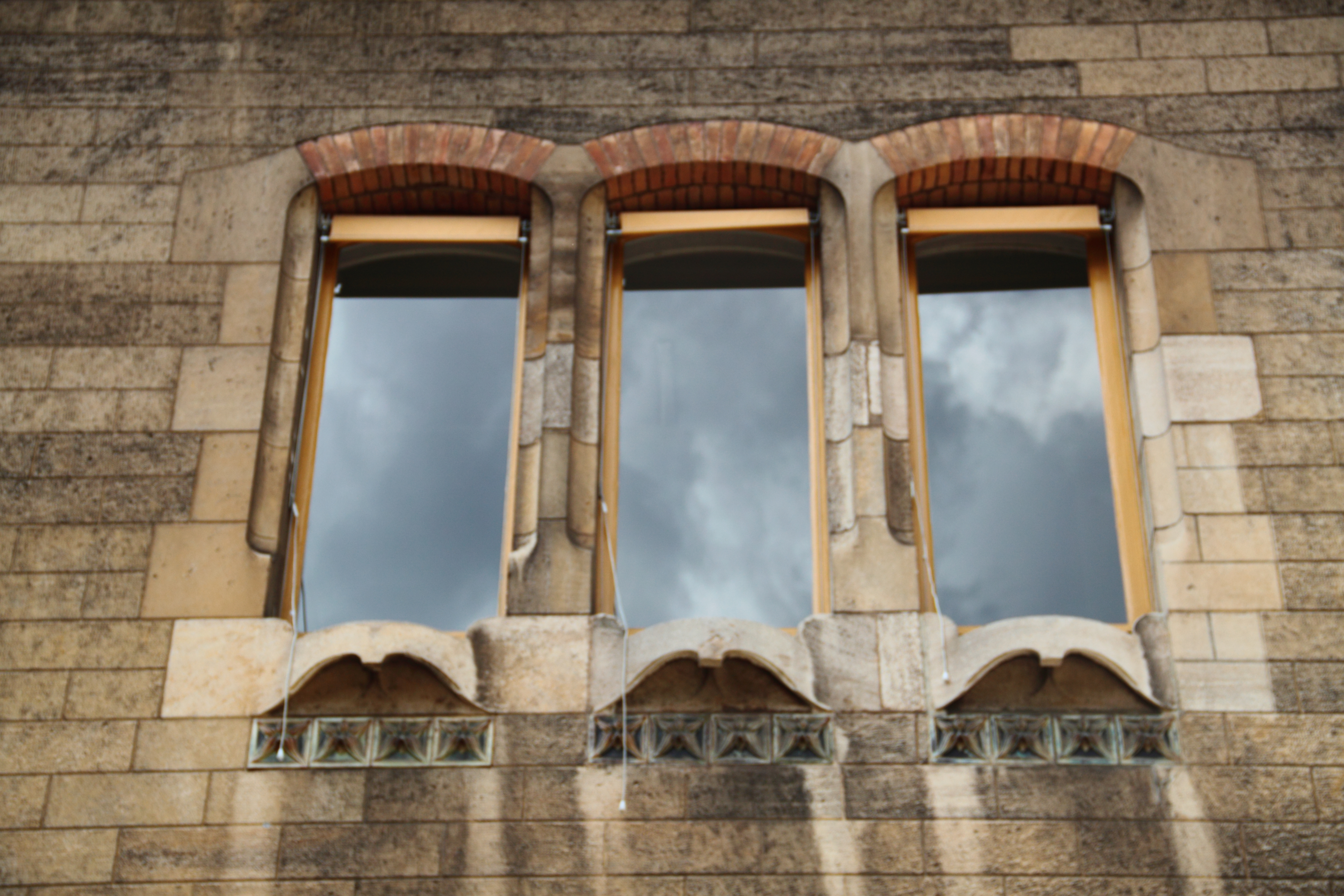
Decoration of upper windows

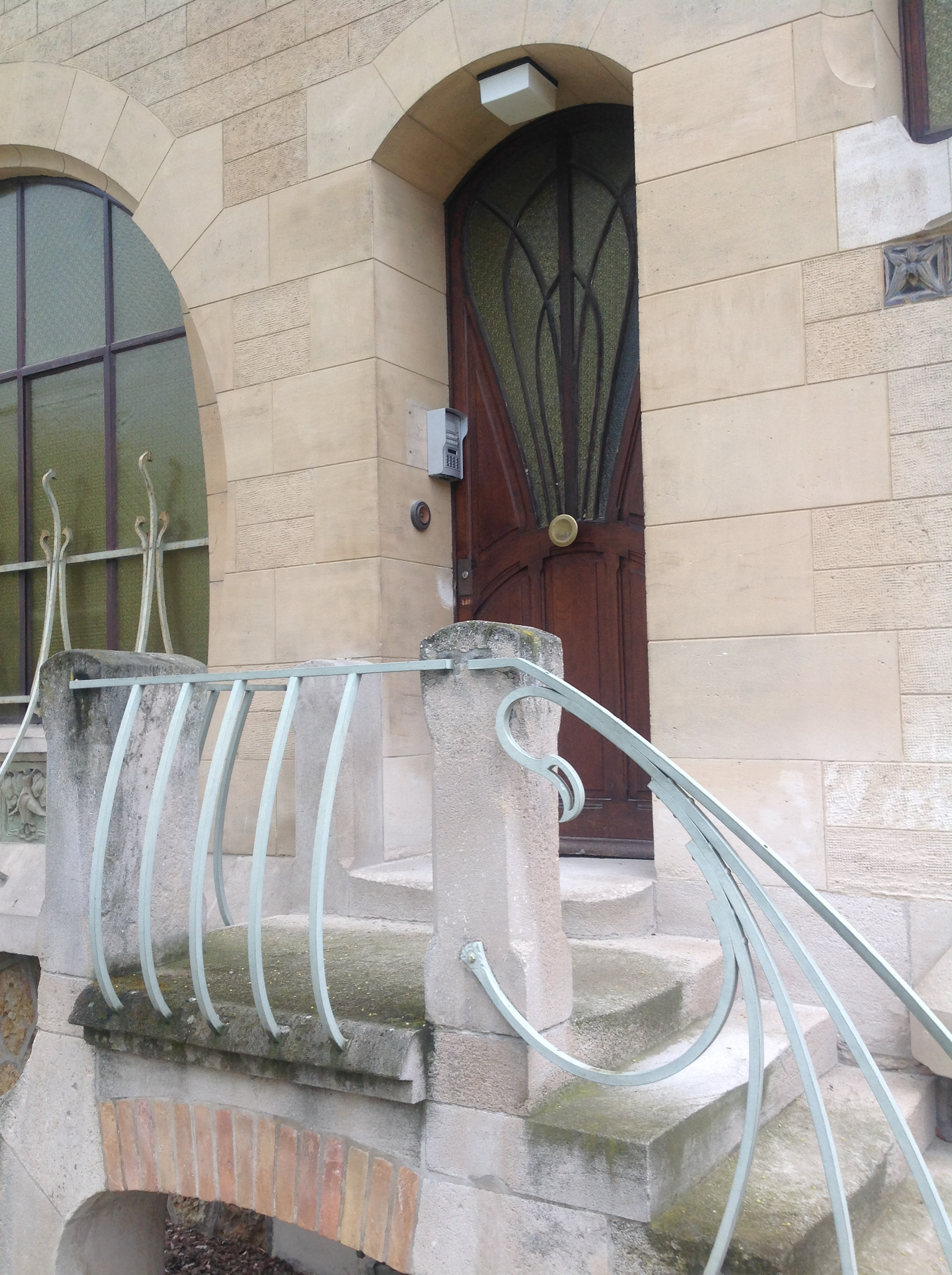
Service entrance

== Interior decoration ==
Only two of the rooms, the dining room/smoking room and the salon, still have some of their original furniture and decoration, and the first floor rooms and studio have been extensively changed, so photographs are the only to see the interior as it used to be furnished. However, much of the original woodwork, ironwork, stained glass and ceramic ornament can still be seen. The charm of the house lay largely in the way that Sauvage was able to harmoniously unify and showcase the works of the different craftsmen who made the ironwork, ceramics, and stained glass throughout the house.

=== The vestibule and stairway ===
The vestibule, inside the front door, has preserved many original decorative elements, including a colorful mosaic floor, a glass and wrought iron grille with a floral design behind the front door; and carved wood panelling and stained glass framing the entrance to the main corridor, which originally also had a floral design tapestry curtain. A large mirror and umbrella rack, placed against the wall facing the doorway, matched the floral pattern of the other decoration and reflected the light coming through the glass and iron front grille. The doors to the corridor were decorated with finely crafted and decorative brass around the locks.

The curving stairway was made of massive oak, finely carved. the stairway was lit by stained glass window with a floral pattern by Jacques Gruber on the first landing, and large windows at the top of the stairwell.

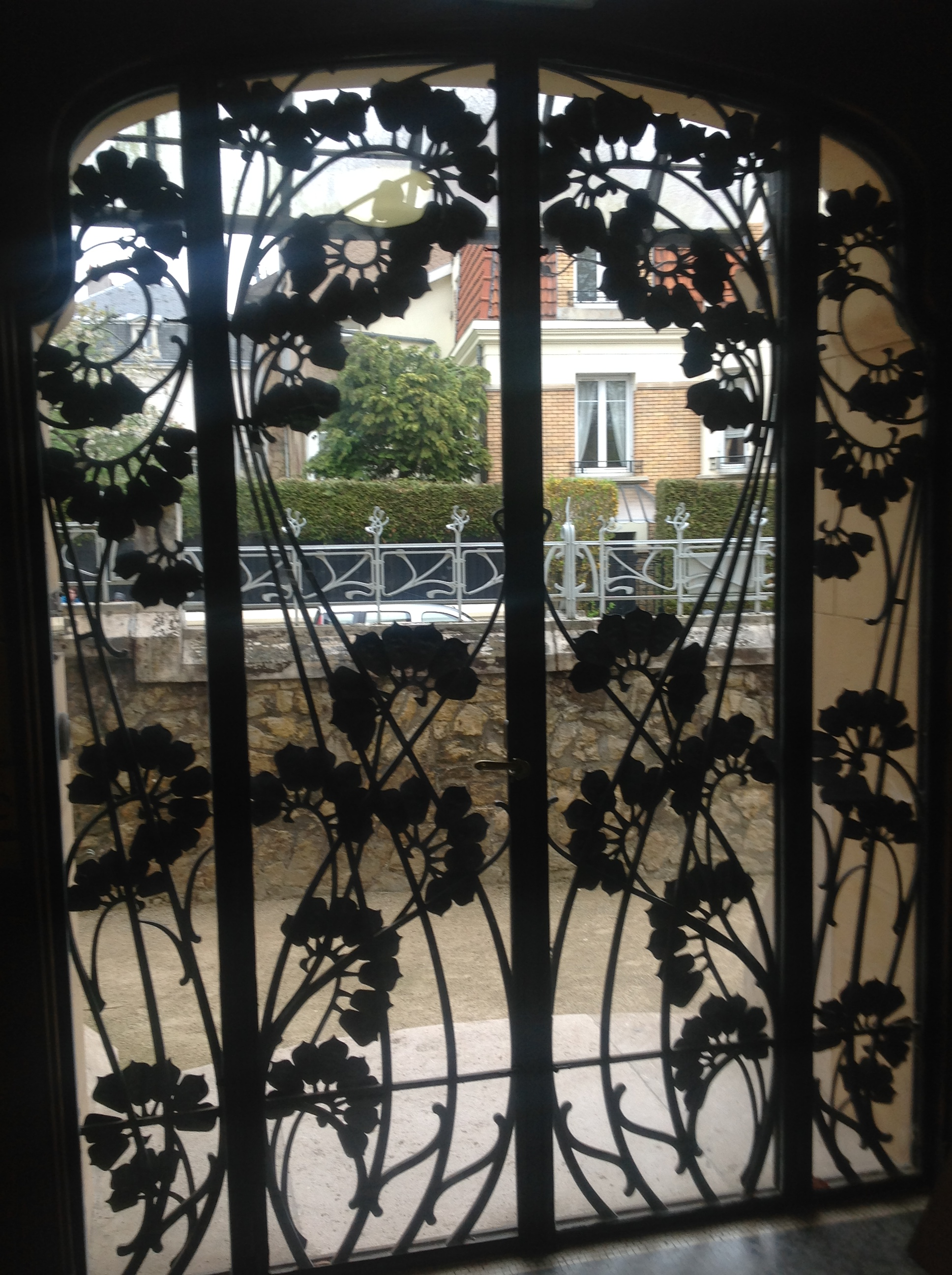
Wrought iron grille of the front entrance

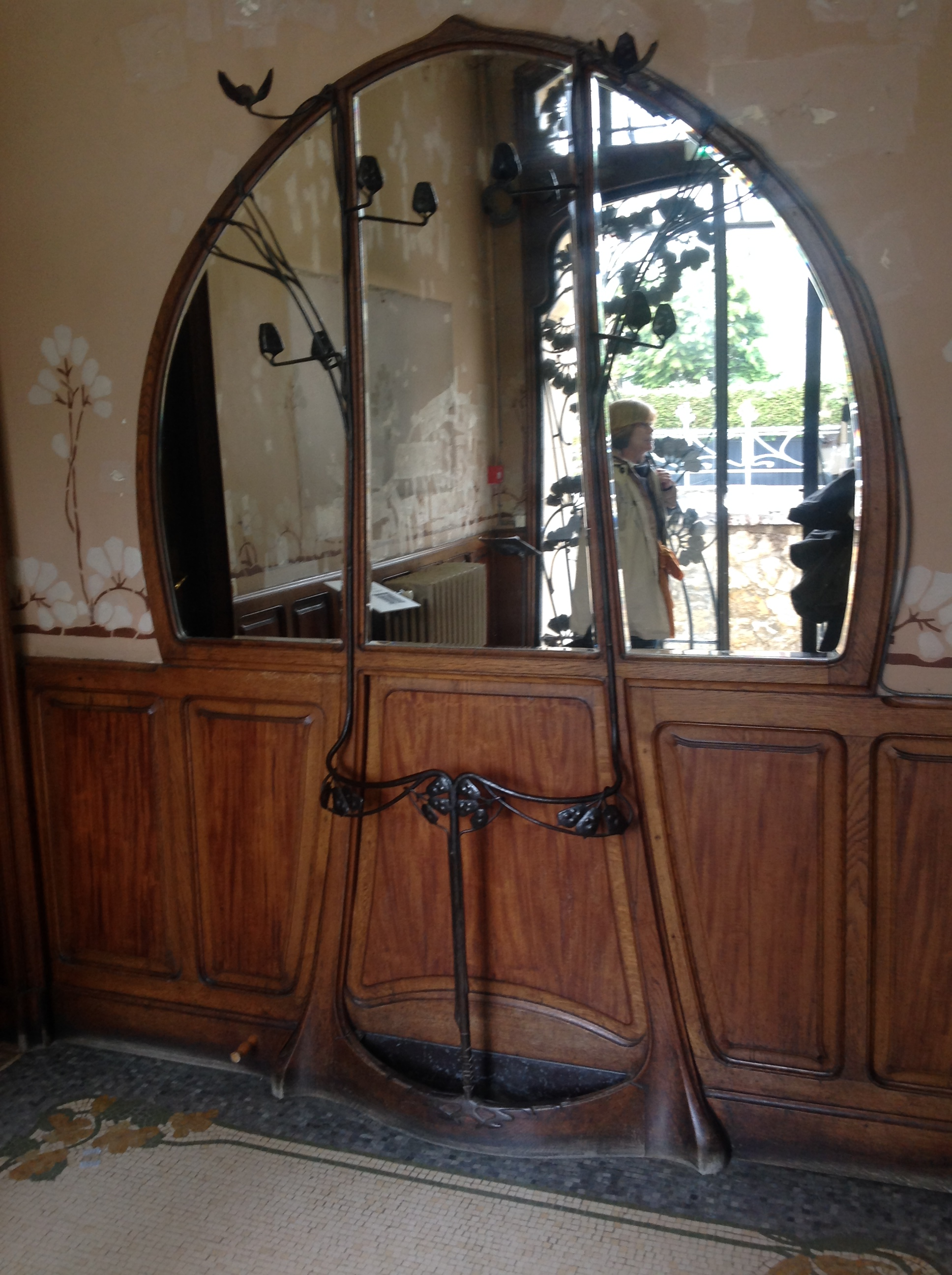
Mirror and umbrella rack in the vestibule

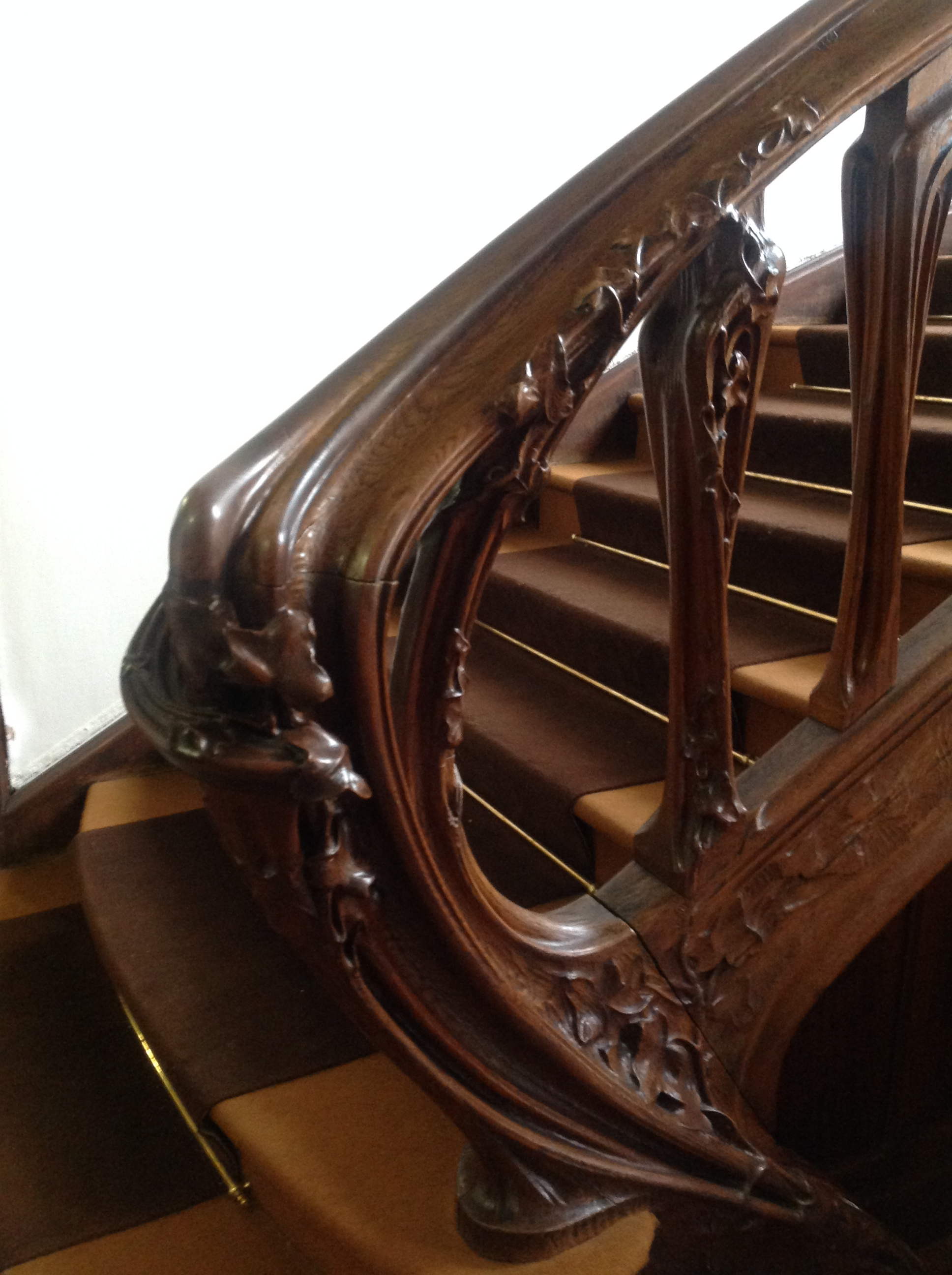
Stairway on the ground floor

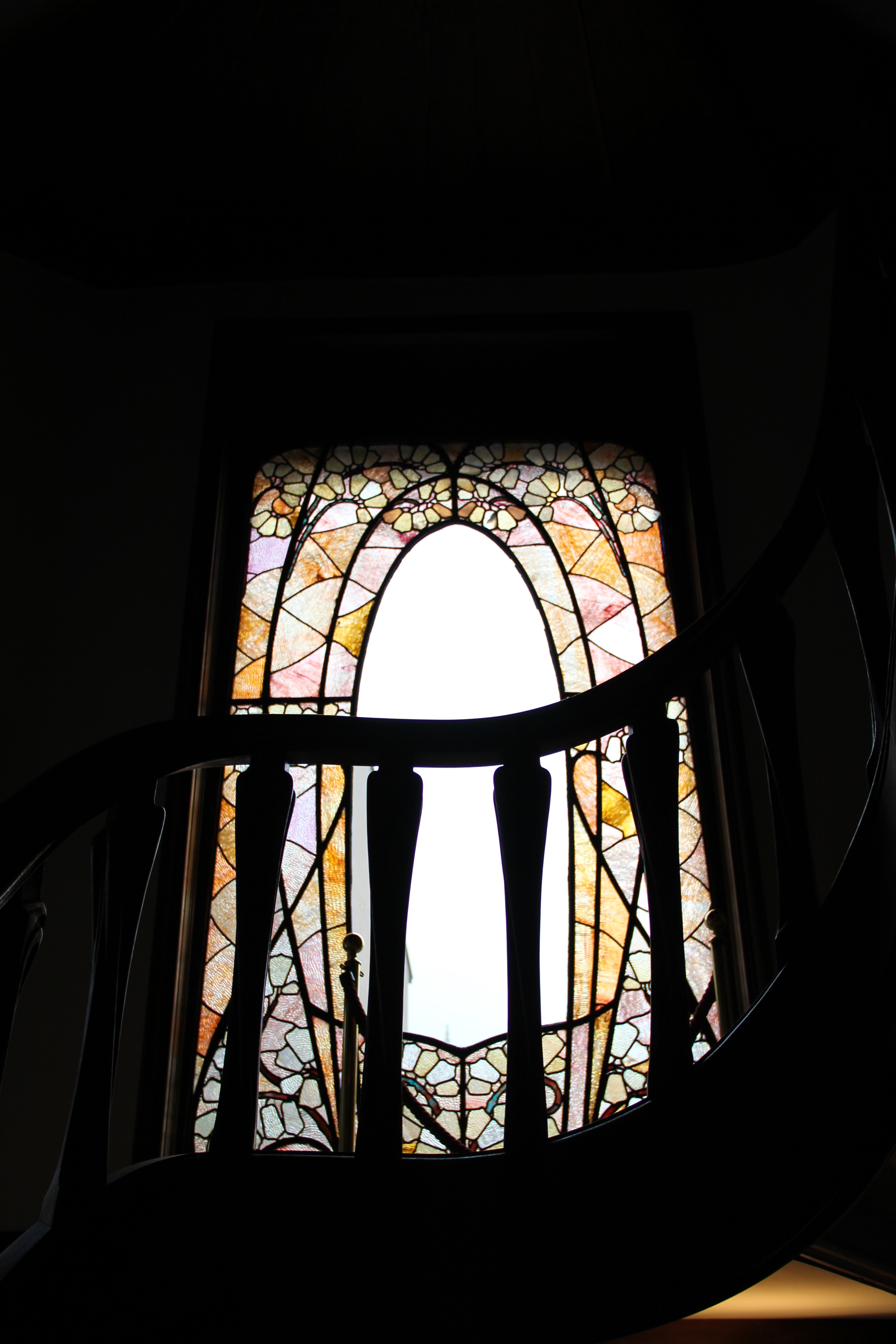
Stained glass window in stairway by Jacques Gruber

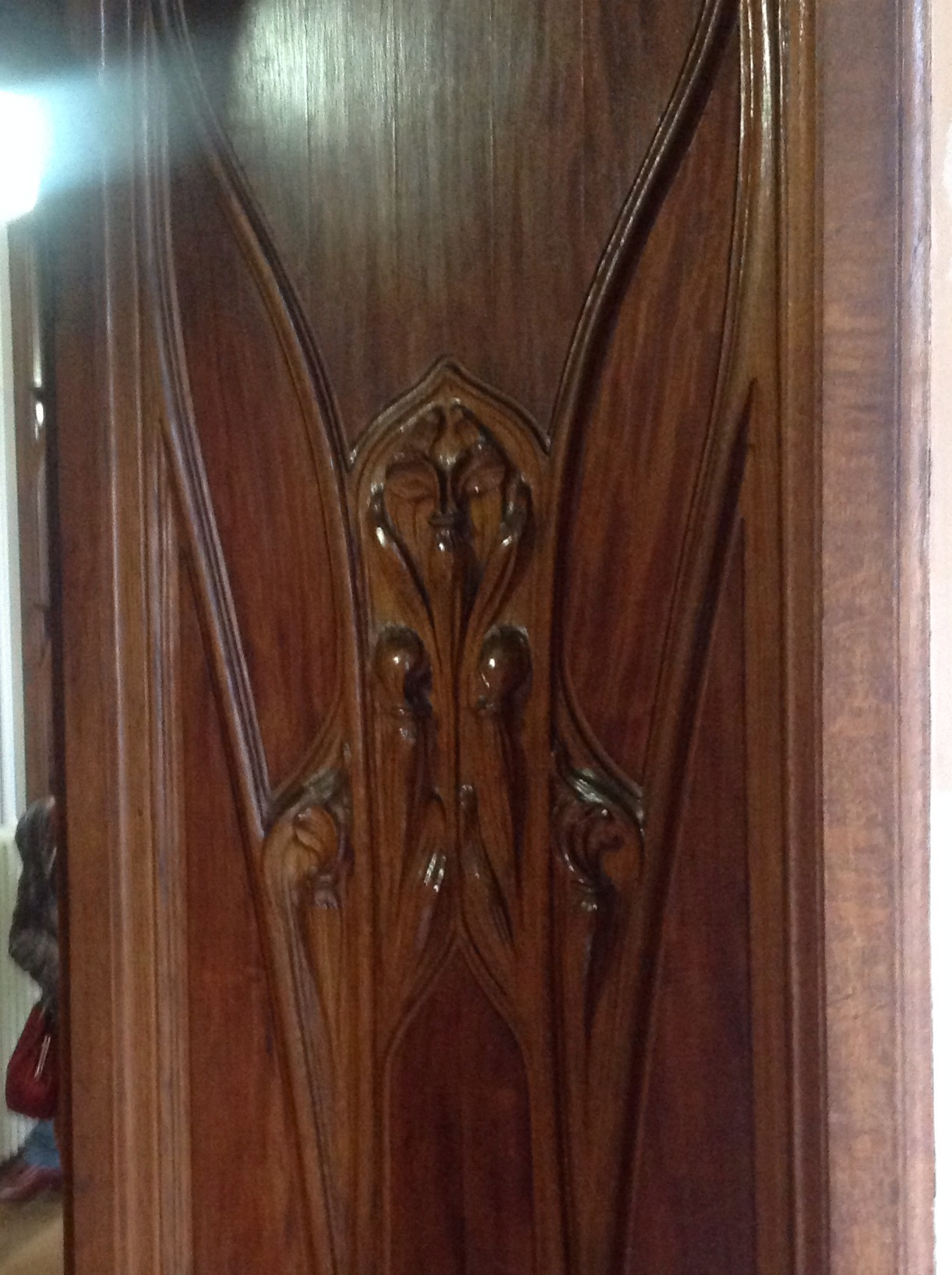
Carved wood panel in the vestibule

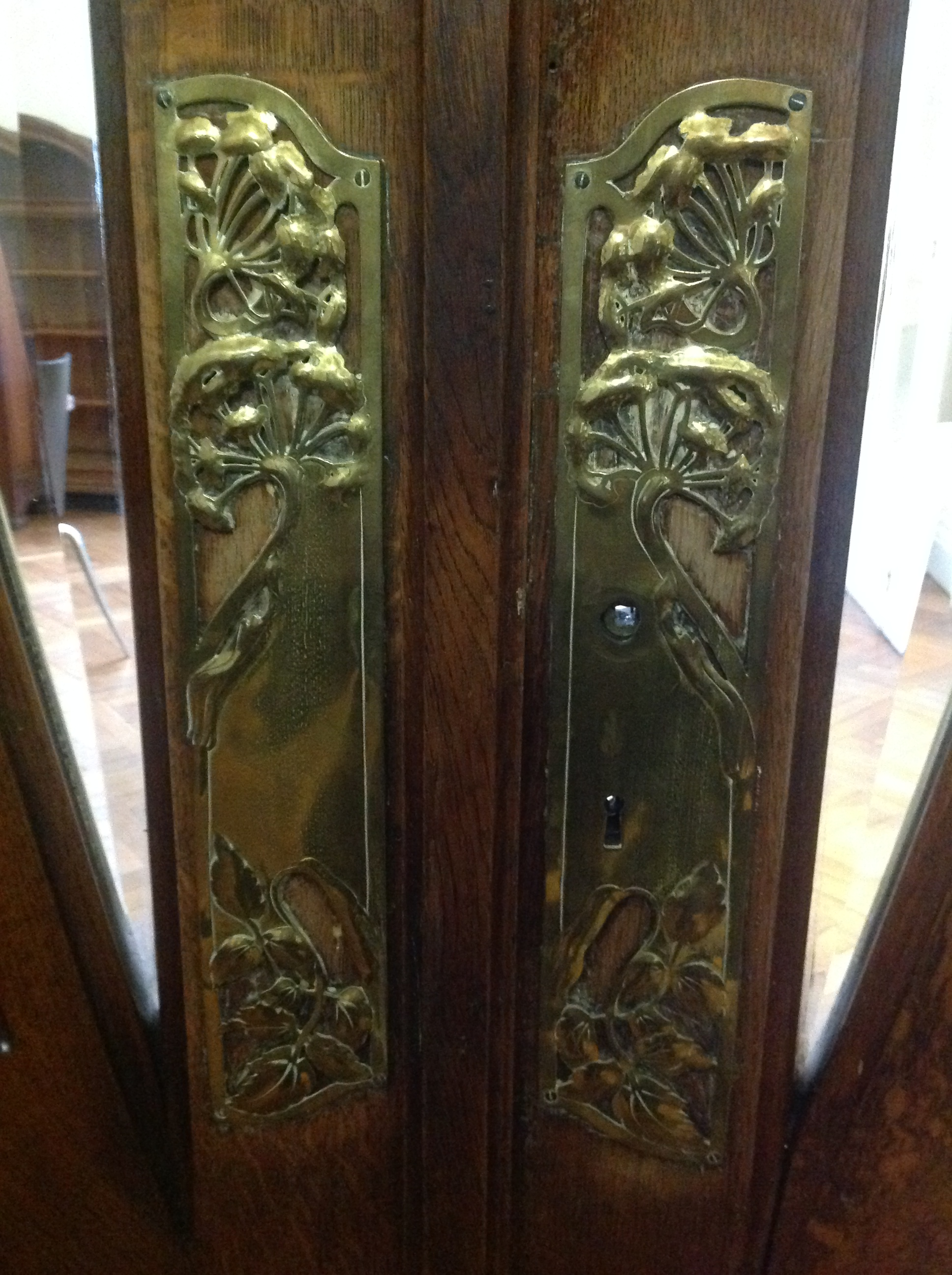
Decorative brass plate on vestibule door

=== The Salon ===
The old photographs of the original decor of the salon show that flowers, both live and dried, were an important part of the decor; there were vases of flowers everywhere, accompanying the floral designs in the ironwork, glass and ceramics. Some of the original furniture was removed by Majorielle's son, the painter jacques Majorelle, who took it to the Villa Majorelle in Marrakech. He replaced the art nouveau glass over the fireplace (visible in the 1904 photo of the salon at the left) with brightly-colored glass from Morocco. He also removed the bedroom set, which after his death was purchased and returned and is now in the Museum of the School of Nancy.

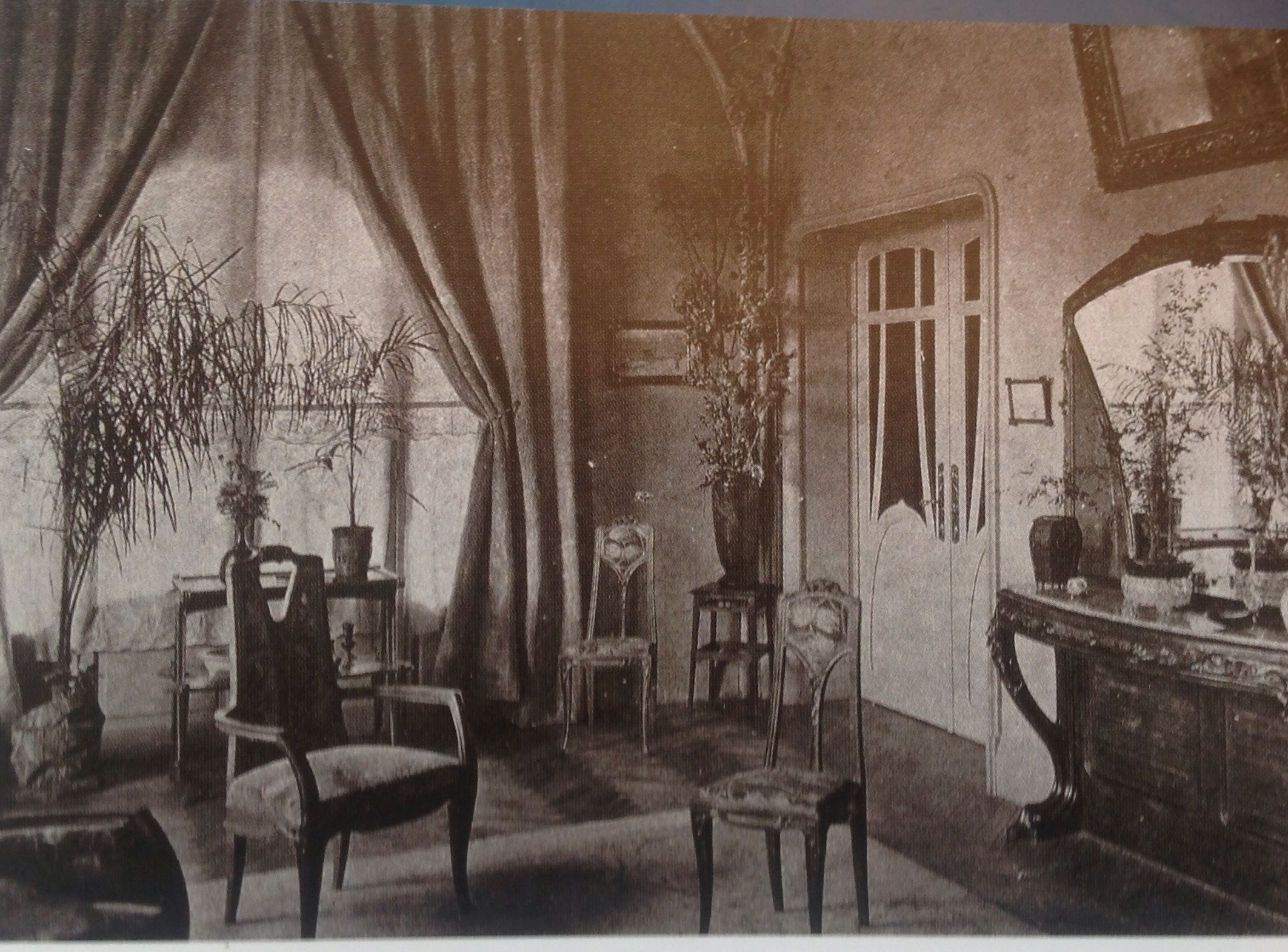
Original fireplace with art nouveau glass and decor of the salon (1904)

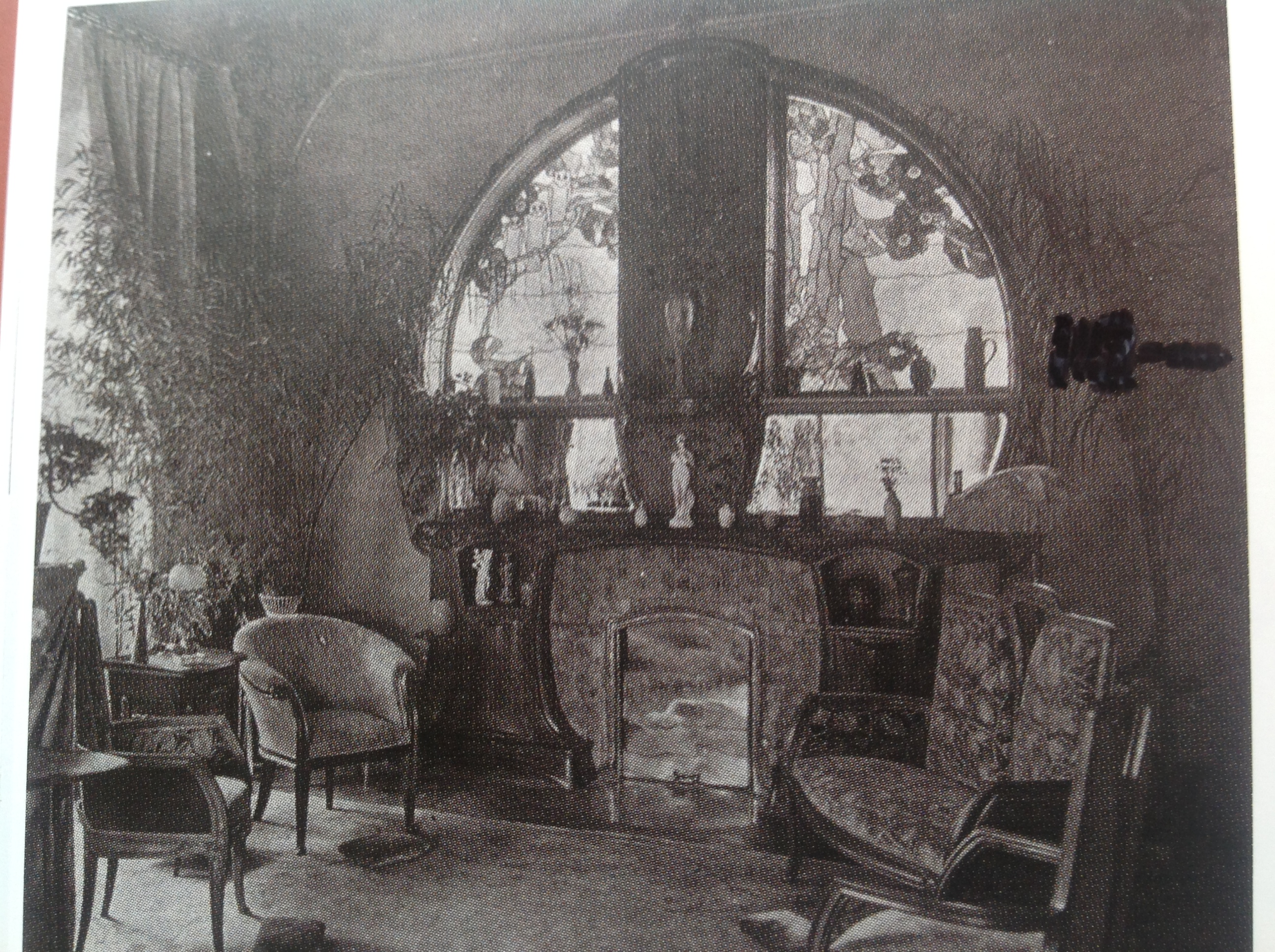
Original fireplace and decor of the salon (1904)

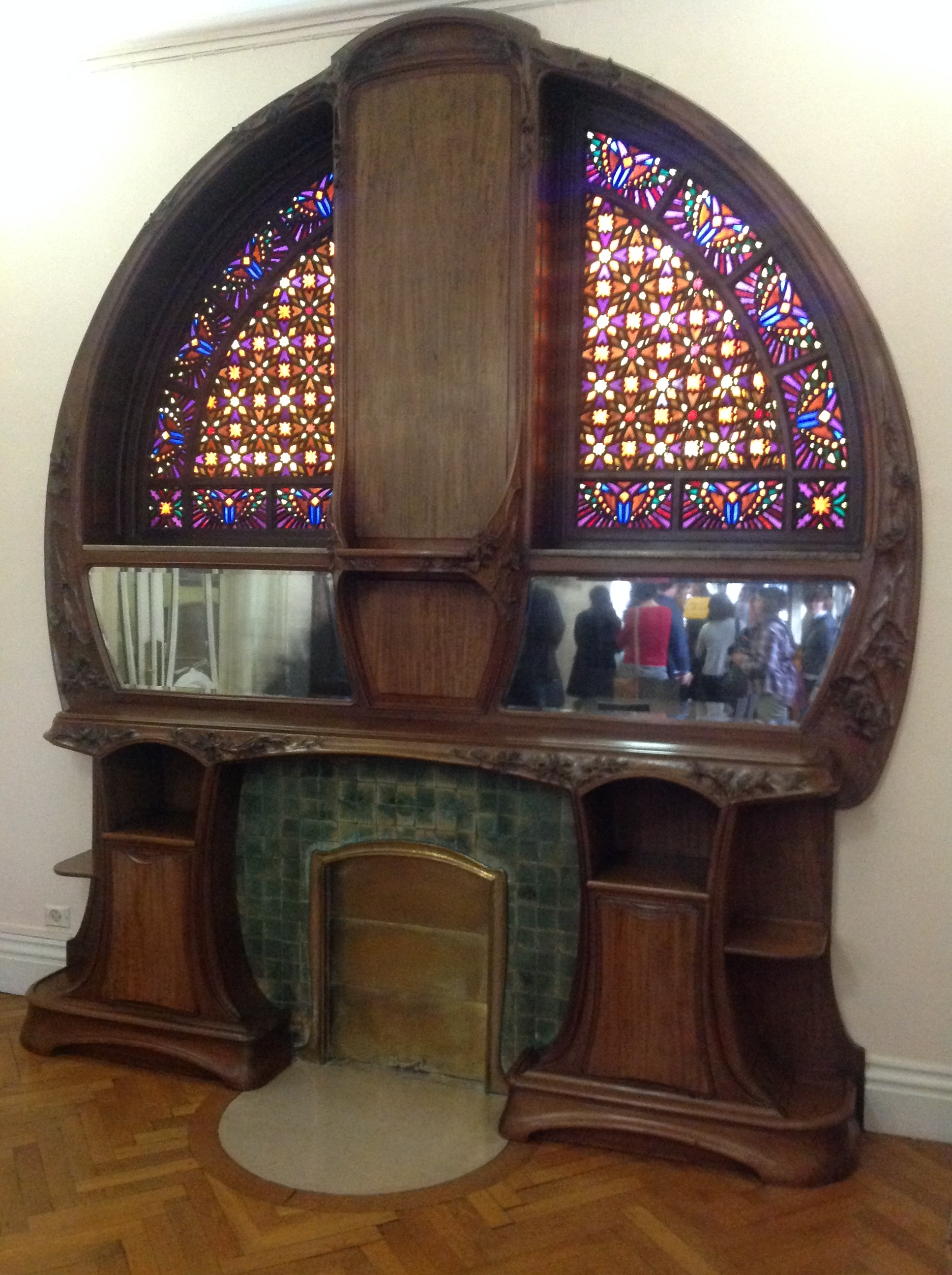
Salon fireplace today, with colored glass added by Jacques Majorelle

=== The dining room/smoking room ===
The combination dining room and smoking room was in the center of the house, with windows looking out the back. It had an open plan; there was no wall separating the two spaces. the border was marked by the highly unusual ceramic fireplace, designed by Alexandre Bigot, in the middle of the room. Around the copper hemisphere where the fire was, It had small ceramic shelves for the placement of vases of flowers or other decoration.

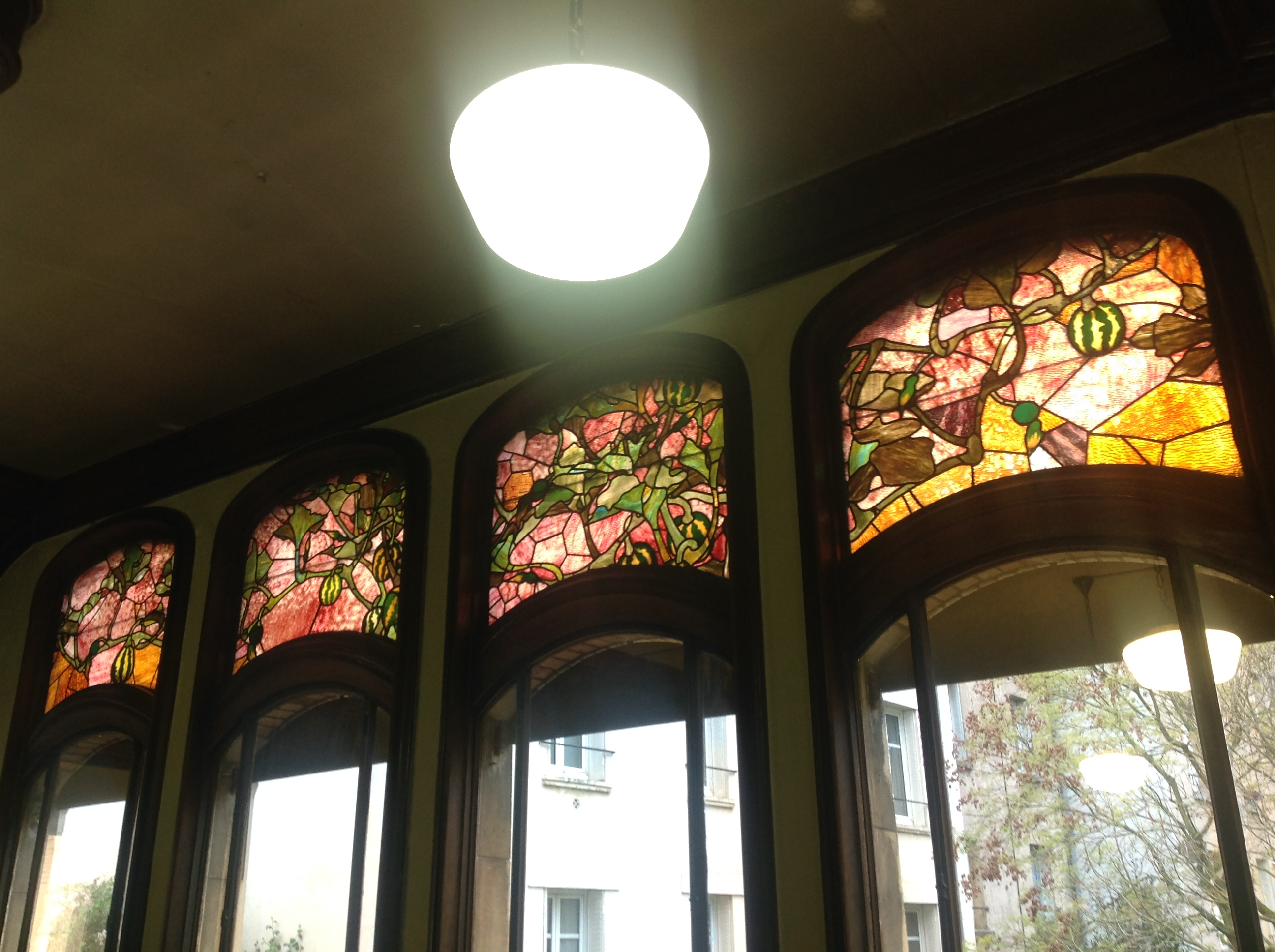
The dining room windows, by Jacques Gruber

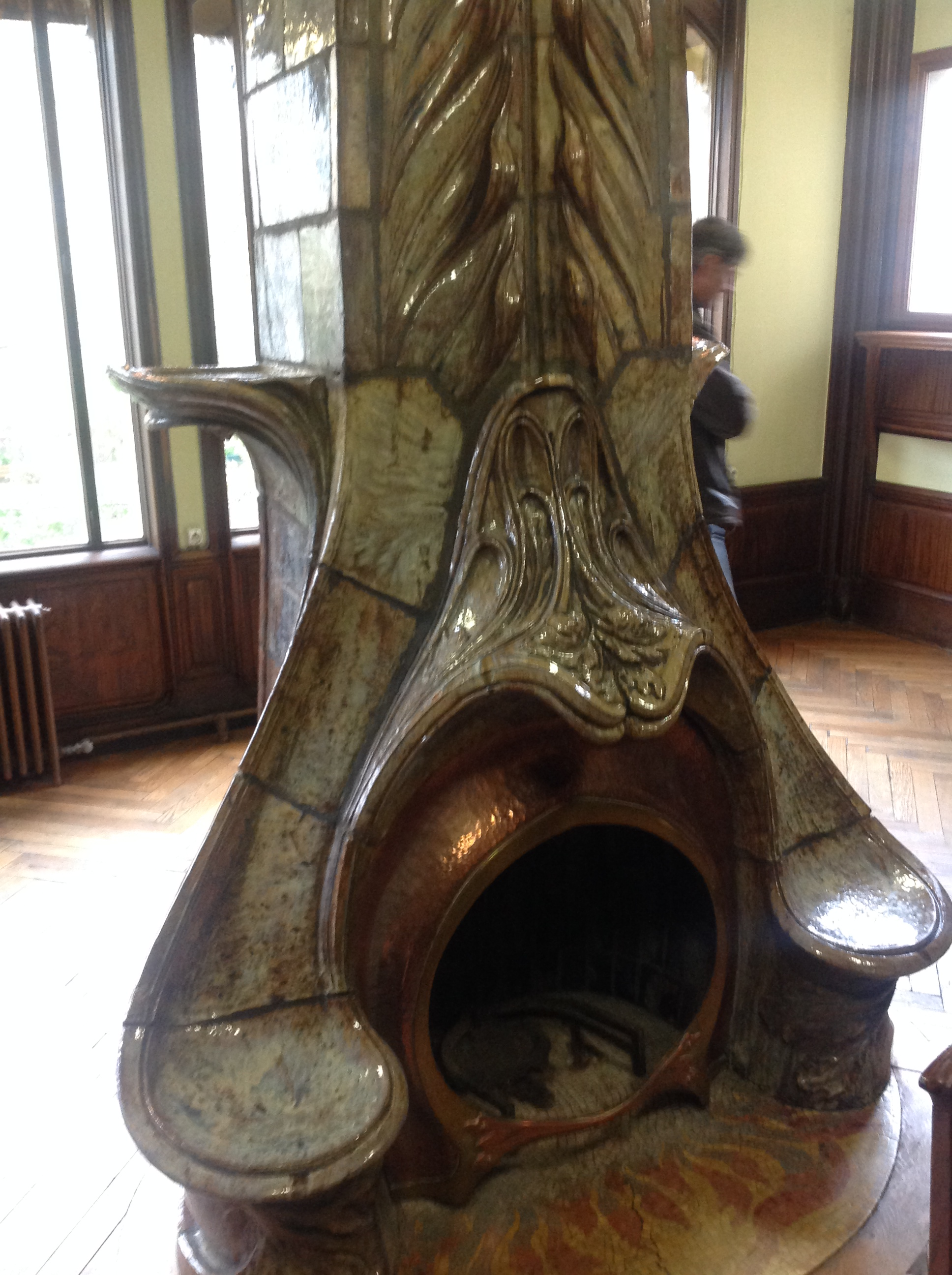
The ceramic fireplace in the dining room/smoking room, by Alexandre Bigot.

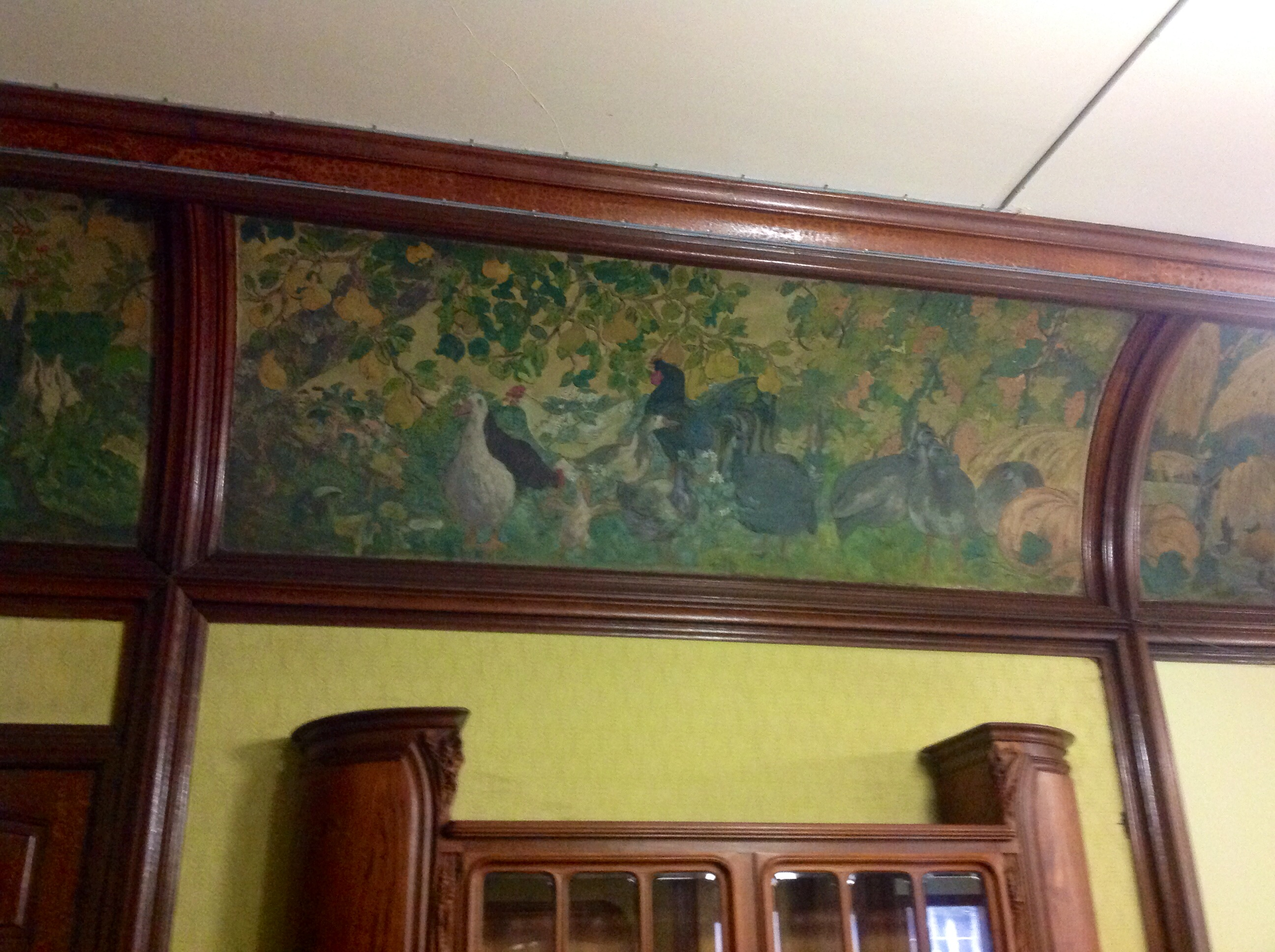
Frieze of game birds by Francis Jourdain on the wall of the dining room

=== Furniture ===
After the death of Louis Majorelle in 1926, his son Jacques inherited the furnishing of the house, and moved much of it, including the bedroom furniture designed specifically for the Villa Majorelle, to Marrakech, where he had his artists studio. In 1982 the bedroom furniture was purchased by the city of Nancy and the Direction of the Museums of France, and was placed in the Museum of the School of Nancy. The bedroom set is virtually intact and unique, and was never reproduced. The wood is Japanese ash or tamo and alder, and the plaques of wood are encrusted with copper and mother of pearl. The knobs of the commode, armoire and chevet are made of bronze in the shape of stylized plants. As of April 2016, the Association of the Friends of the Museum of the School of Nancy had plans for installing some of the original furnishings now in the Museum back to its original place in the house.

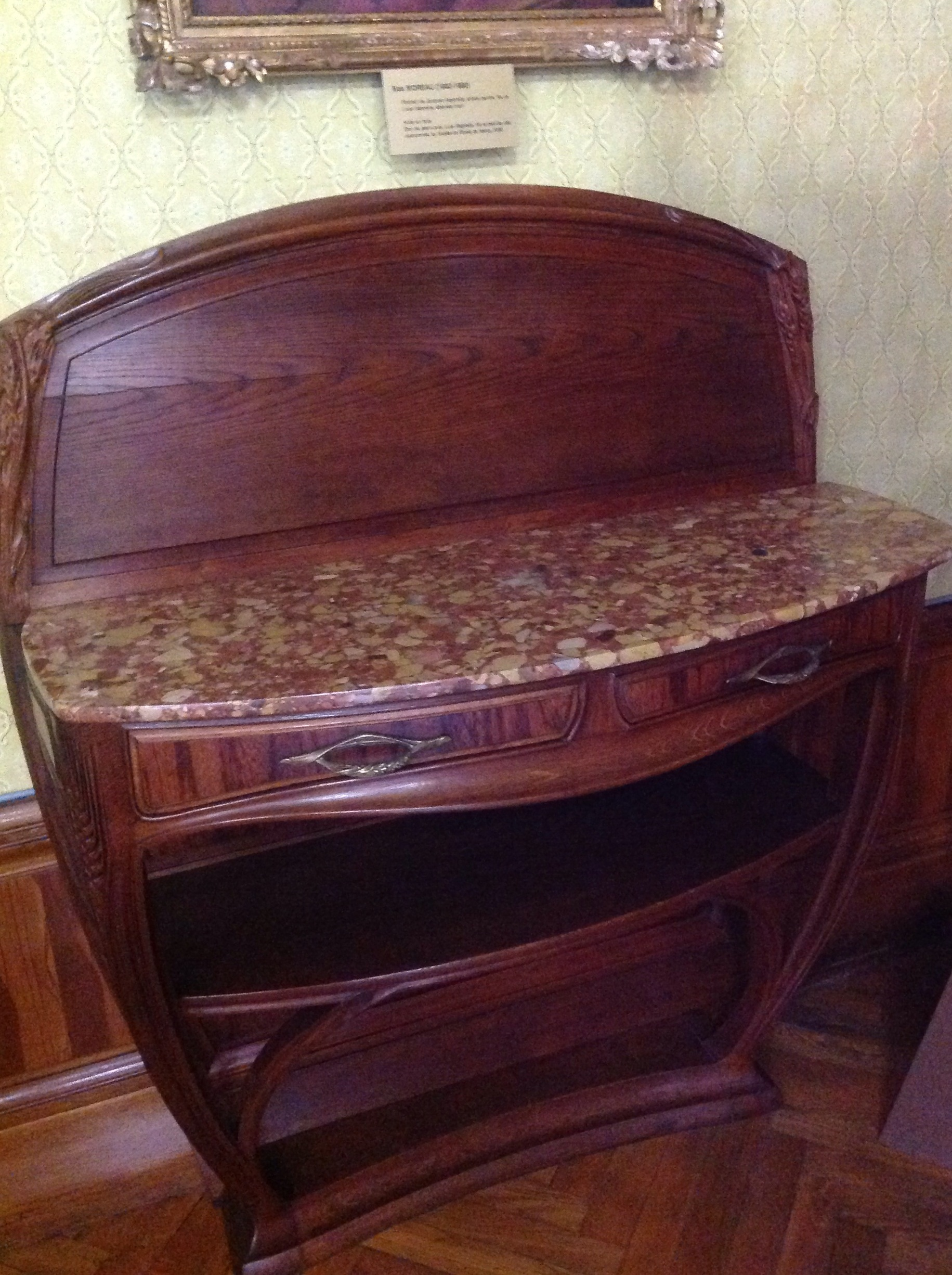
Furniture by Louis Majorelle in the salon

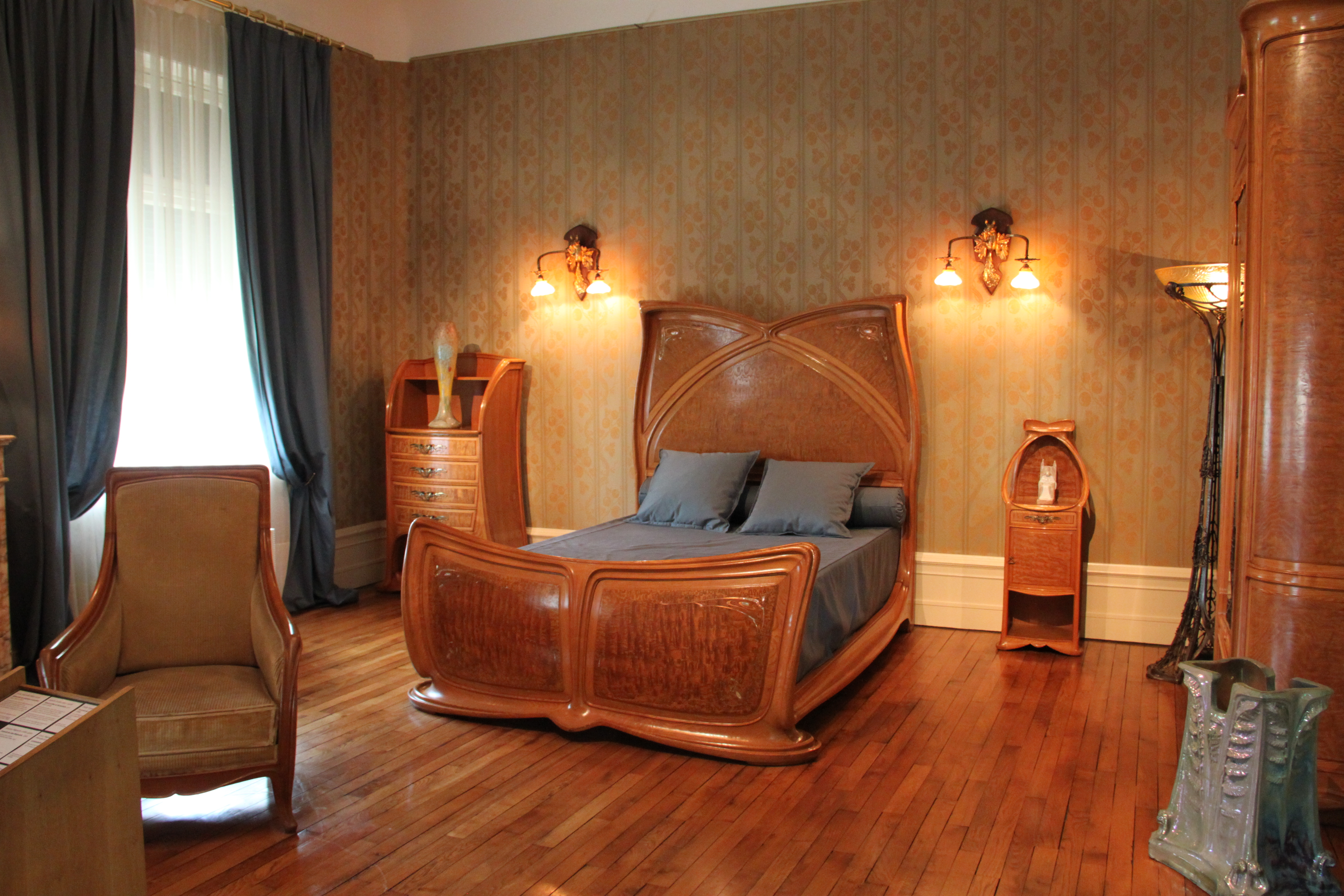
The bedroom furniture from the Villa Majorelle, that was previously in the Museum of the School of Nancy

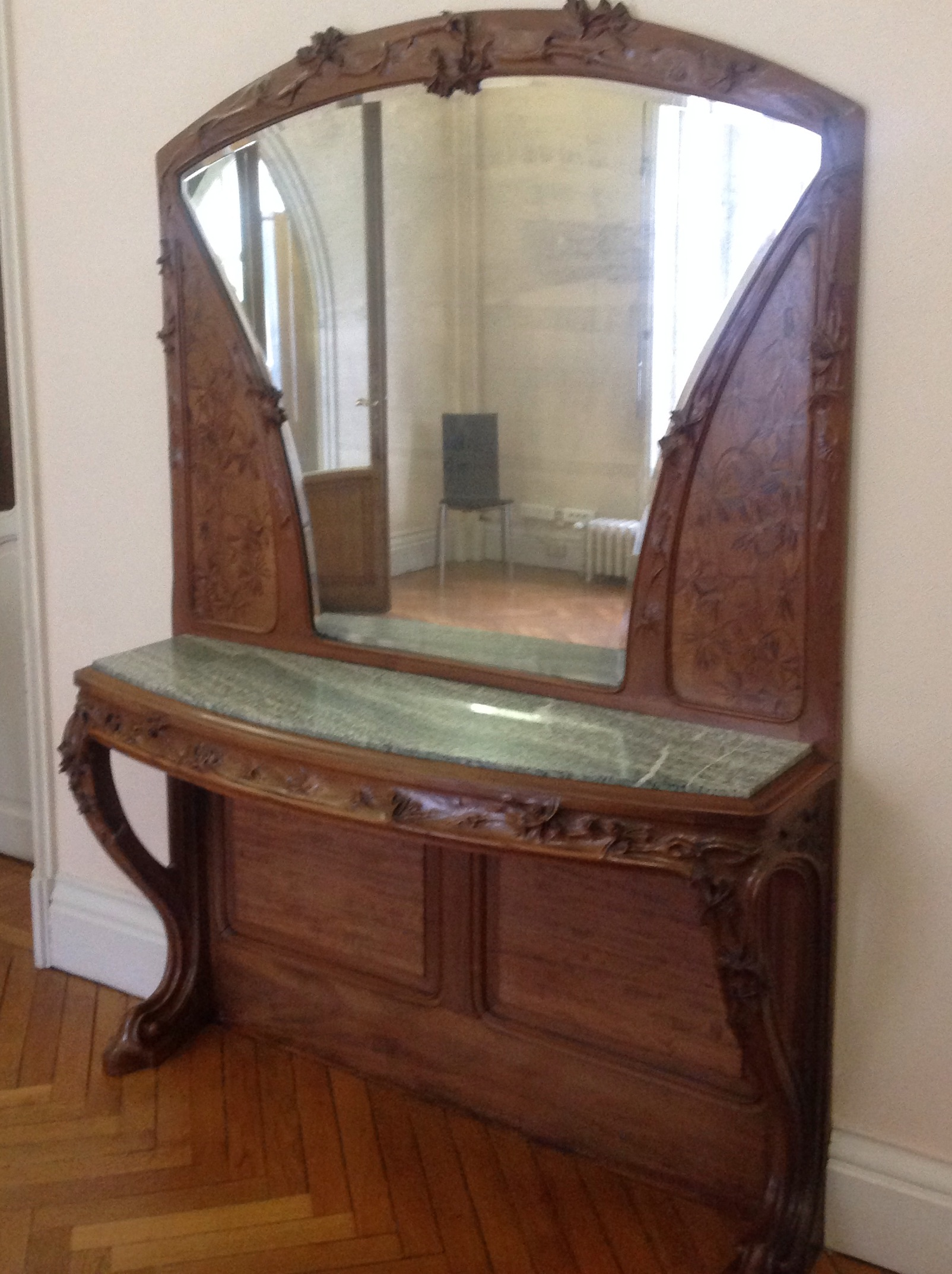
Furniture by Louis Majorelle in the salon

== Bibliography ==
- Bouvier, Roselyne (1987). "Villa Majorelle". Arts Nouveaux: Bulletin de l'Association des Amis du Musée de l'École de Nancy. Association des Amis du Musée de l'École de Nancy. ISSN 1147-2073.
- Renault, Christophe (2006). Les Styles de l'architecture et du mobilier. Editions Jean-Paul Gisserot. ISBN 978-2-877474-658.}
- Lahor, Jean. L'Art Nouveau. Baseline Co. Ltd. Originally published 1901, adapted version 2007. (in French). ISBN 978-1-85995-667-0
