= Artistic Japan =

Le Japon artistique
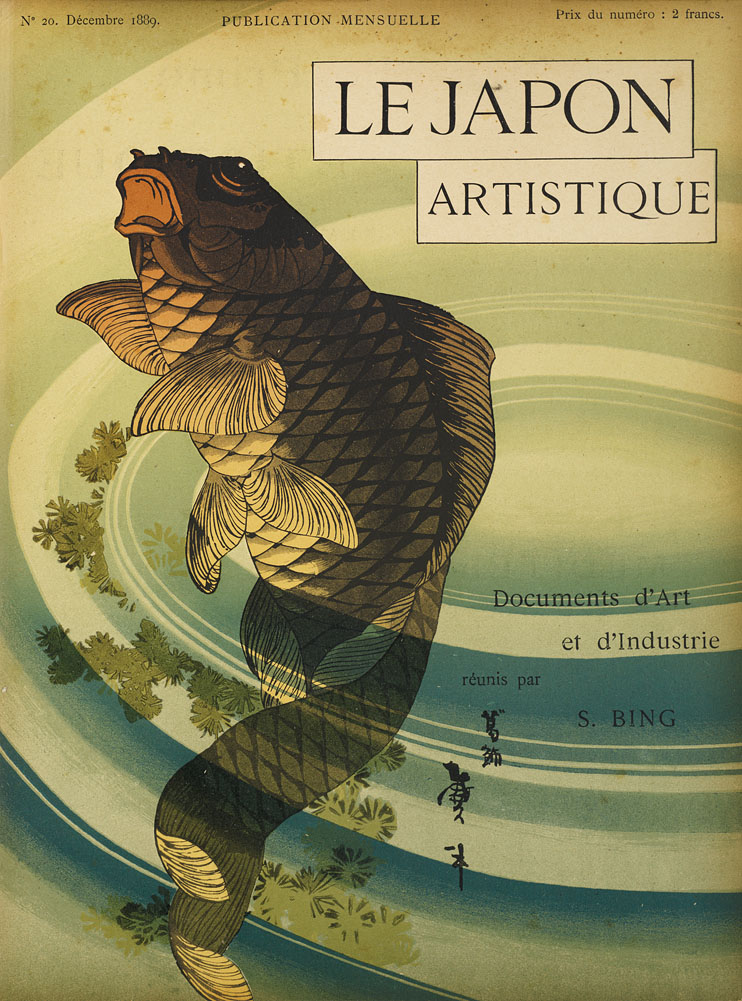
- December 1889 French edition
- Editor: Siegfried Bing
- Categories: Japanese art
- Frequency: Monthly
- First issue: 1888
- Final issue: 1891
- Language: English; French; German

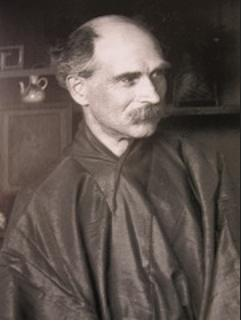
Siegfried Bing in a kimono

Artistic Japan was a magazine of Japanese art, published by German-born French art dealer Siegfried Bing. It ran for thirty-six monthly issues from 1888 to 1891 in French, English, and German editions and contributed to a revival of Japonism.

== Background ==
Art critics and collectors in Europe spearheaded a craze for Japanese art in the late 19th century; prominent promoters of this Japonism included Edmond de Goncourt (1822–96), Philippe Burty (1830–90), and Siegfried Bing (1838–1905). Burty made an attempt at a magazine devoted to Japanese art that lasted a single issue.

The wealthy collector and dealer Bing had placed himself at the centre of Japanese art circles in Paris; where he had relocated from Hamburg in Germany to take over a branch of the family business dealing in imports of French porcelain. In the late 1870s he opened a shop selling Japanese art objects and travelled to the Far East to study art in 1880. He developed connections with art sources in Japan and amassed what was considered one of the finest Japanese art collections in the West. He desired to spread word of Japanese aesthetics to a broad public, and used his wealth and connections to populate a new magazine to this end.

== Publication ==
Bing enlisted his friend, the director of the Museum für Kunst und Gewerbe Hamburg Justus Brinckmann (1843–1915), to translate and print a German-language edition of the magazine. The English art dealer Marcus Bourne Huish (1845–1922) handled publication of an English-language that also circulated in the United States.

The magazine aimed to educate the public, and enjoyed high-quality printing featuring reproductions drawn from private collections. Each issue had several colour tipped-in pages of reproductions of Japanese artwork such as paintings or ukiyo-e prints. It featured essays on Japanese art and art history by critics such as Burty, de Goncourt, and Louis Gonse, drawn from Bing's wide circle of acquaintances in the art world. The articles examined a wide variety of Japanese arts: its architecture, painting, woodblock printing, pottery, and even poetry and theatre. Bing also drew attention to the high aesthetic quality of everyday objects such as combs, tea ladles, and fabrics.

== Reception and legacy ==
Bing made effort to have Artistic Japan widely reviewed. It received positive reviews throughout the West, as far away as Scandinavia and the US. The London-based periodical The Academy praised its first issue's "attractiveness". The American The Critic rated it "among the highest class of art-journal". The established reputations of the contributing writers to which Bing had access contributed to the magazine's quick acceptance as an authority.

The vogue for Japanese art had reached a peak by the time the magazine appeared. French artist and collector of Japanese art George Auriol expressed hope that the magazine would rekindle an appreciation of its true aesthetic qualities in the face of its brimming commercialization. The Japan Weekly Mail newspaper ran regular denigrating reviews of the magazine's reproduction and writing quality and Bing's understanding of Japanese history and society.

The magazine benefited Bing as a dealer, as prices for Japanese artworks rose with awareness of their value; this was one aim of Bing's, and he attracted some criticism for it. The magazine's reproductions served as models to Western graphic designers. Gabriel P. Weisberg has asserted that Artistic Japan was a major force in solidifying the valued position Japanese art was to have in the West. The aesthetic quality of the magazine itself won lasting recognition; in 1906 Gustav Klimt obtained a complete run.

== Works cited ==
- Hokenson, Jan (2004). Japan, France, and East-West Aesthetics: French Literature, 1867–2000. Fairleigh Dickinson University Press. ISBN 978-0-8386-4010-4.
- Weisberg, Gabriel P. (Spring 1986), "On Understanding Artistic Japan", The Journal of Decorative and Propaganda Arts, 1, Florida International University Board of Trustees on behalf of The Wolfsonian-FIU: 6–19, doi:10.2307/1503900, JSTOR 1503900
