= Eugène Gaillard =

French art nouveau industrial designer, architect and advocate of modern design

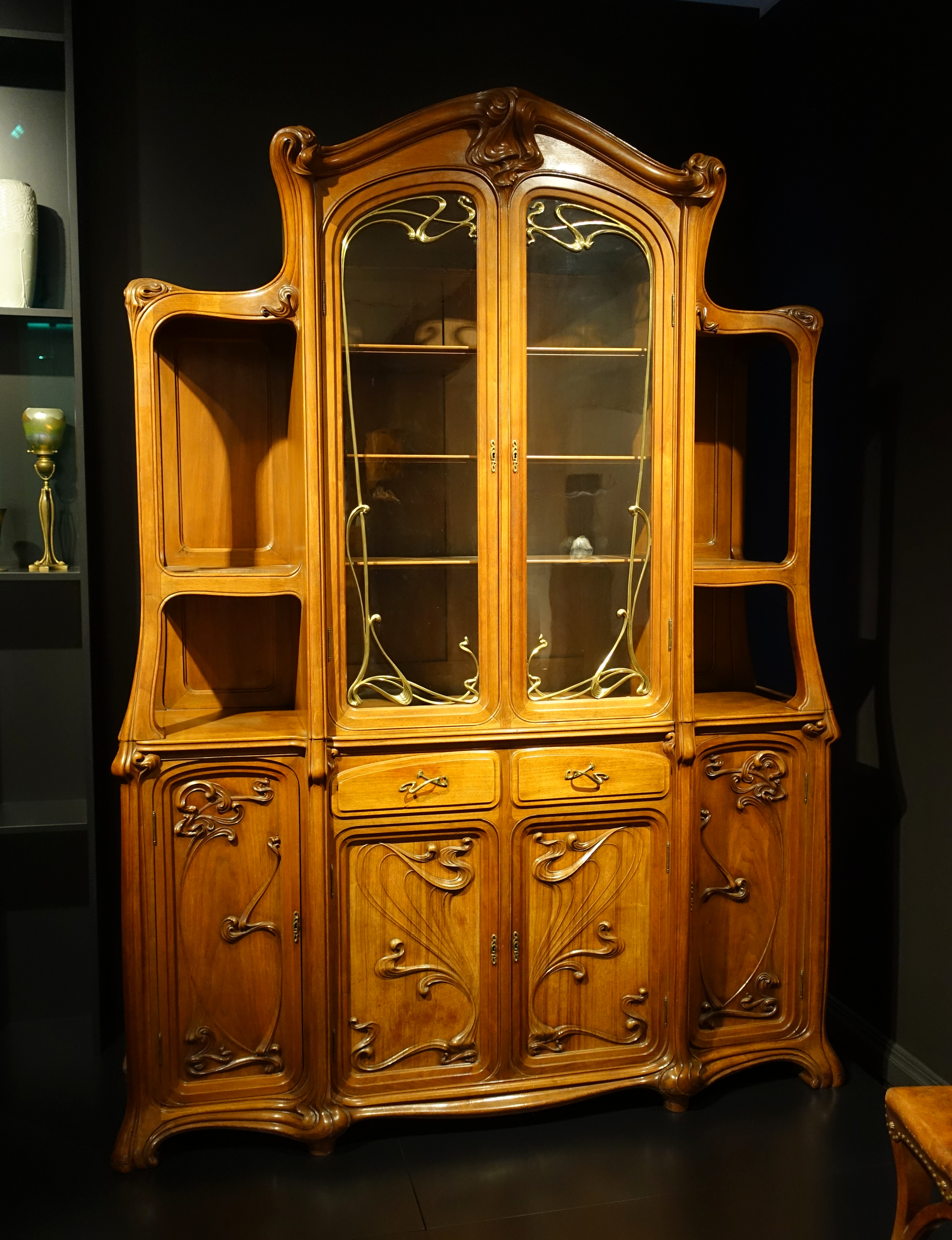
Dining-room vitrine, designed by Eugene Gaillard, Paris, 1899-1900

Eugène Gaillard (1862–1933) was a French Art Nouveau industrial designer, architect and advocate of modern design. Gaillard abandoned a career in law for that of interior design and decoration. He was employed for some time by Siegfried Bing along with Georges de Feure and Edouard Colonna to work on his pavilion at the 1900 Paris Universal Exposition.

== Bibliography ==
- A Propos du Mobilier - Eugène Gaillard (1906)
