= Siegfried Bing =

German-French art dealer

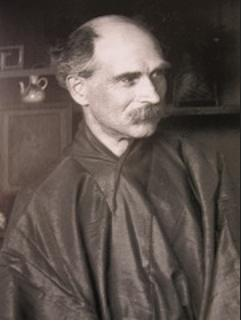
- Bing, wearing a hanfu, photograph by Hughes Krafft (1889)
- Born: 26 February 1838
- Died: 6 September 1905 (aged 67)
- Occupation: Art dealer, art collector, publisher (1888–1891)

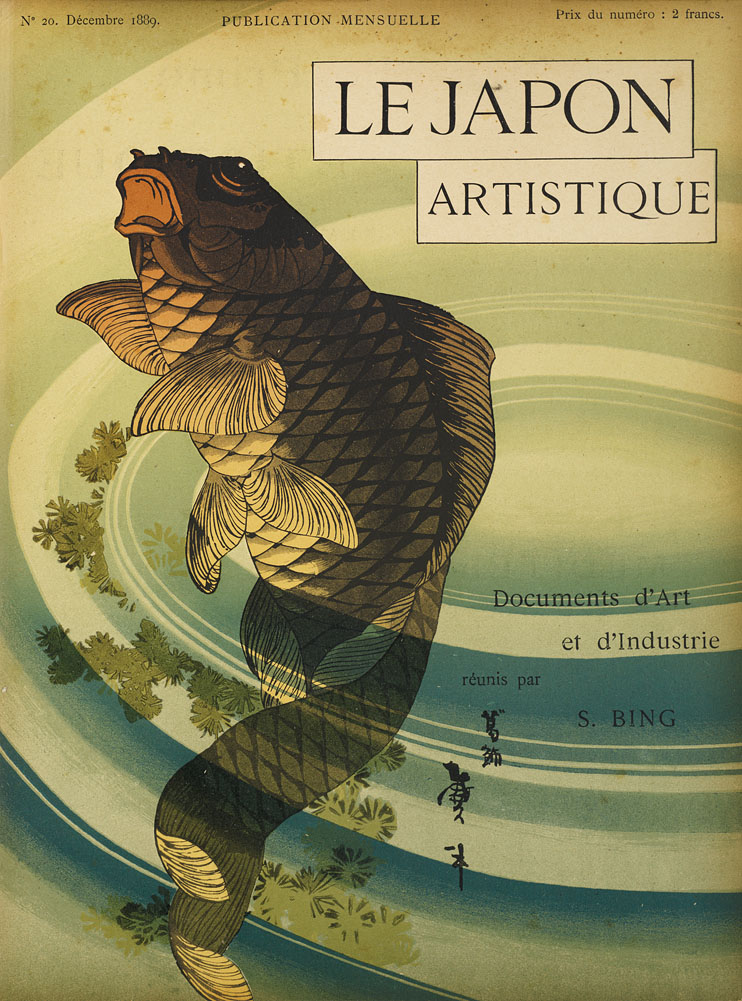
Cover of an issue of Le Japon Artistique, which he published from 1888 to 1891

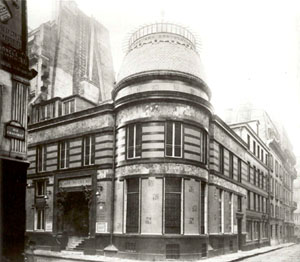
His gallery the Maison de l'Art Nouveau in Paris

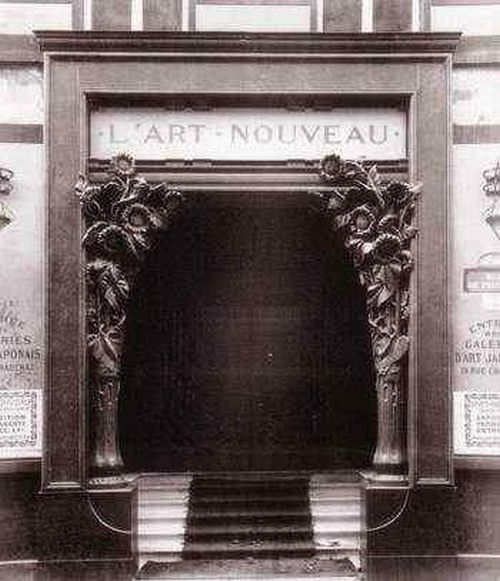
Gallery entrance

Samuel Siegfried Bing (26 February 1838 – 6 September 1905), who usually gave his name as S. Bing (not to be confused with his brother, Samuel Otto Bing, 1850–1905), was a German-French art dealer who lived in Paris as an adult, and who helped introduce Japanese art and artworks to the West and was a factor in the development of the Art Nouveau style during the late nineteenth century.

== Early life ==
Bing was born in Hamburg, a member of a large family with diverse commercial interests. He relocated to France in 1854, to help manage the ceramics manufacturing business of Bing family in-laws, and resided in France for the remainder of his life. He became a naturalised French citizen in 1876. Bing married a second cousin, Johanna Baer, in July 1868. Their son Marcel Bing eventually became a business associate of his father's, as well as a jewellery designer of Art Nouveau style.

== Career ==
In 1873, on the death of his elder brother Michael, Siegfried Bing became the head of Bing family enterprises in France. Bing developed a flourishing import-export business from the 1870s onward, working through several commercial entities with various partners and family members; he concentrated on the importation and sale of Japanese and other Asian objets d'art, though his business also exported French goods to Japan, working through a Yokohama office managed by his younger brother August. In December 1895 he opened his famous gallery, the Maison de l'Art Nouveau, which showed works of artists of what would become known as the Art Nouveau style. Henry van de Velde designed the interior of the gallery, while Louis Comfort Tiffany supplied stained glass. Bing's gallery featured entire rooms designed in the Art Nouveau style by his in-house designers.

During the gallery's most successful period (1896–1902), Bing sold a great variety of artistic work, including fabrics designed by William Morris, glassware by Louis Comfort Tiffany, jewellery, paintings, ceramics, stained glass, and furniture of Art Nouveau style. Bing dealt with customers ranging from private collectors to major museums, and helped to promote a global art market. His pavilion at the 1900 Paris World's Fair was especially notable. By this time Bing was the primary European dealer for the Rookwood Pottery Co. of Cincinnati and the Grueby Faience Company of Boston, as well as the wares of Tiffany.

Bing had also a significant role in promoting artists who were associated in the new style movement named Les Nabis, including Pierre Bonnard, Édouard Vuillard, Maurice Denis, Paul Sérusier, Paul Ranson, and Félix Vallotton.

== Influence ==
Bing advanced the careers of a wide range of artists, including Louis Bonnier, Frank Brangwyn, and Édouard Vuillard, the designers Eugène Gaillard, Edward Colonna, William Benson, and Georges de Feure, and the sculptor Constantin Meunier. Bing closed his gallery during 1904, a year before his death, when the fashion for Art Nouveau was already beginning to wane.

Bing's activities were important, perhaps crucial, to the Japanese influence on Art Nouveau. He published a monthly journal, Le Japon Artistique, which began in 1888 and was collected in three volumes in 1891. The journal influenced people like Gustav Klimt.

Bing died in September 1905 and was buried in the Père Lachaise Cemetery of Paris (7th division).

== References and sources ==
Sources

- Dam, Peter van. "Siegfried Bing 1838-1905." Andon, Summer 1983, pp. 10–14.
- Miyajima Hisao. "S. Bing's visit to Japan." In: Bulletin of the Study of Japonisme 2 (1982), S. 29–33.
- Troy, Nancy J. Modernism and the Decorative Arts in France: Art Nouveau to Le Corbusier New Haven: Yale University Press, 2001.
- Weisberg, Gabriel P., Edwin Becker, and Évelyne Possémé, eds. The Origins of L'Art Nouveau: The Bing Empire. Amsterdam: Van Gogh Museum, distributed by Cornell University Press 2004. ISBN 0-8014-4387-3
- Weisberg, Gabriel P., Art Nouveau Bing: Paris Style, 1900 Harry N Abrams Inc New York 1986 ISBN 978-0-8109-1486-5
