= Mougin brothers =

French sculptors and ceramists

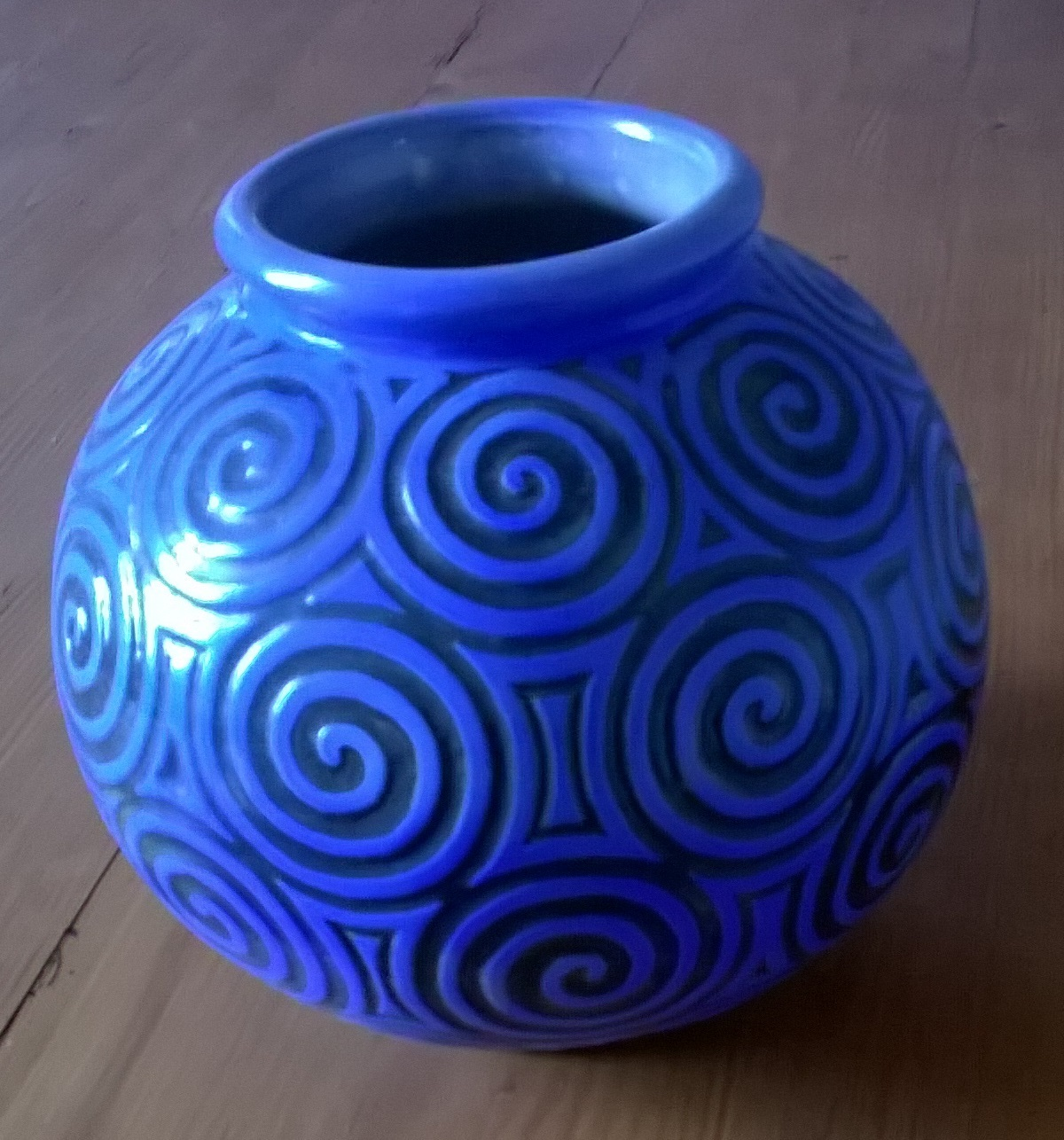
Stoneware vase signed "frères mougin", 1920's, Lunéville pottery.

Joseph Mougin (7 June 1876 – 8 November 1961) and Pierre Mougin (15 May 1880 – 7 September 1955) were French sculptors and ceramists, making art pottery in Art Nouveau and Art Deco styles, and close to the École de Nancy.

== Early life ==
Joseph Mougin was born in Nancy, and his younger brother Pierre in Laxou. Sons of Xavier Mougin, they came from a family of glass cutters, but dedicated their life to ceramics. As a young man, Joseph Mougin studied art, but was also fascinated by horticulture and several forms of science, which gave him a natural sensitivity to what would become the main inspiration themes of the Art Nouveau movement. His brother Pierre, a great Sarah Bernardt admirer, gave up acting classes to embrace a career as a ceramist with his elder brother.

== Artistic career ==
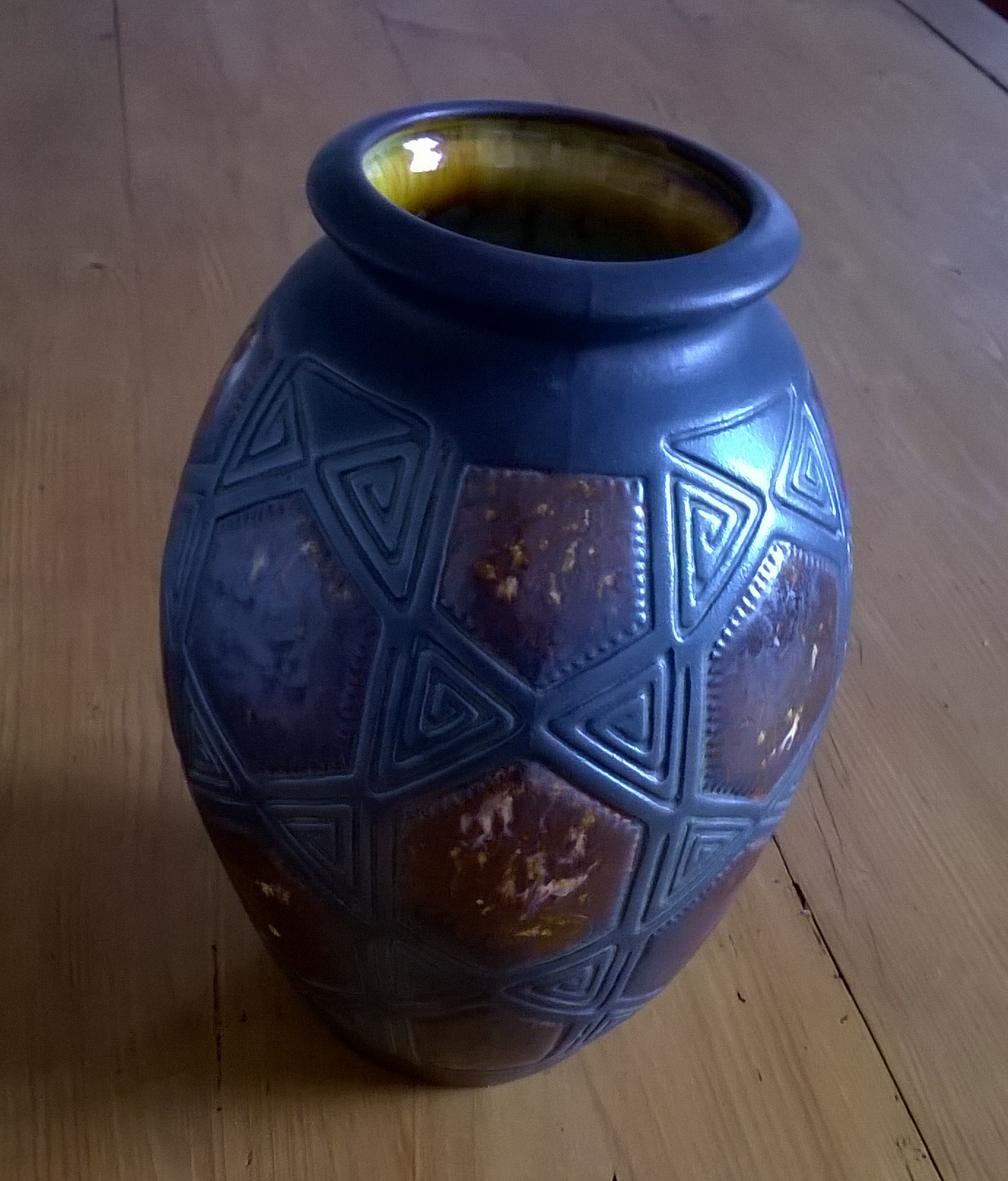
Stoneware vase signed "frères mougin", 1925, Lunéville pottery.

The first part of Mougin brothers' work is deeply connected to Art Nouveau, combining vegetable naturalism and female symbolism, crystallizations with glazes. Their first works are exhibited at the Universal Exhibition in Paris, 1900; but Joseph feels they still can improve their art, so he chooses to attend Sèvres manufacture as a student. Although not officially part of the Ecole de Nancy, the two brothers get very close to its members, especially with Victor Prouvé who they admire a lot and become great friends with. This friendship opens many doors : Joseph and Pierre then lease their services to other ceramists, to get enough money to survive and also keep working on research for their own productions. Among the many artists who trust them with the edition of their works are Victor Prouvé, Ernest Wittmann, Louis Majorelle, Alfred Finot and many others, which also leads them to several prizes and honorary titles.

At the end of the first world war, the economic context is pretty bad, and once again Victor Prouvé is the one who changes Mougin brothers' destiny. He introduces them to Edouard Fenal, who hires them at Luneville Faience factory. At this time, they choose to experiment the potential of geometric shapes, lines and volumes offered by brand new Art Deco, and live quite a comfortable life for several years, although they have to accept some of their work being the object of mass production. Thanks to their constant search for innovation and delicacy, they are rewarded with a prize in 1925 International Exposition of Modern Industrial and Decorative Arts.

In 1933, due to increasing tensions at the Luneville earthenware, they end their contract, and Pierre Mougin soon decides to retire from ceramics. Joseph Mougin however keeps focusing on his researches until the end of his life, with the help of several of his children.

== Legacy ==
The rue Joseph Mougin in Nancy is named after the elder brother.

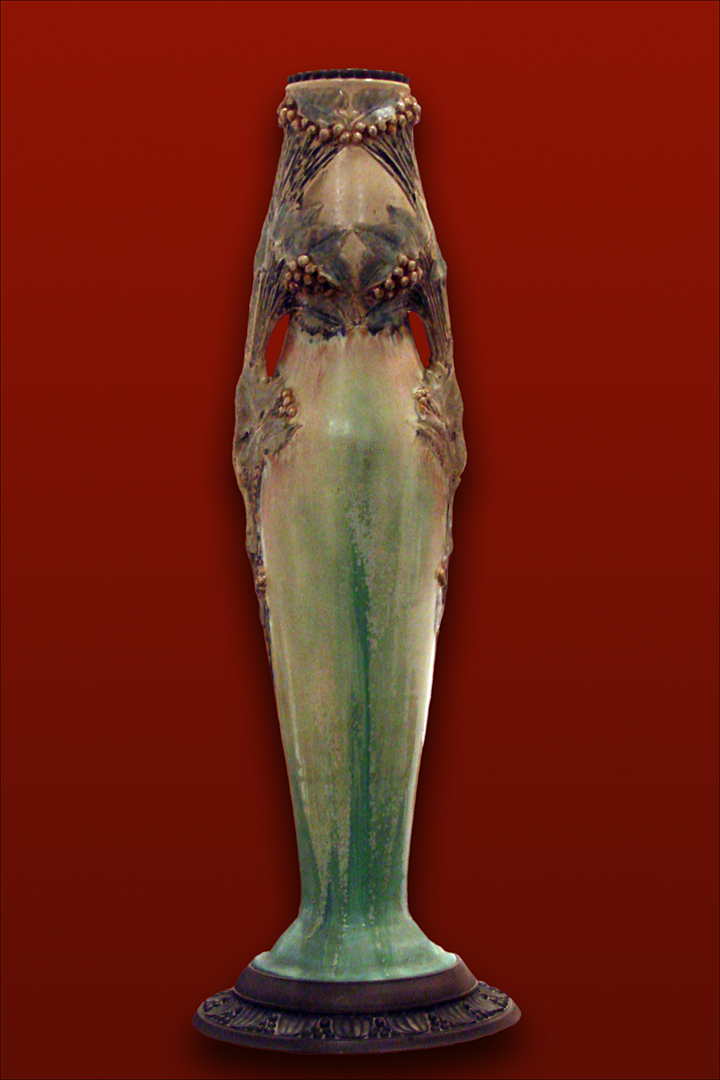
Stoneware vase with bronze base, 1913, Joseph Mougin

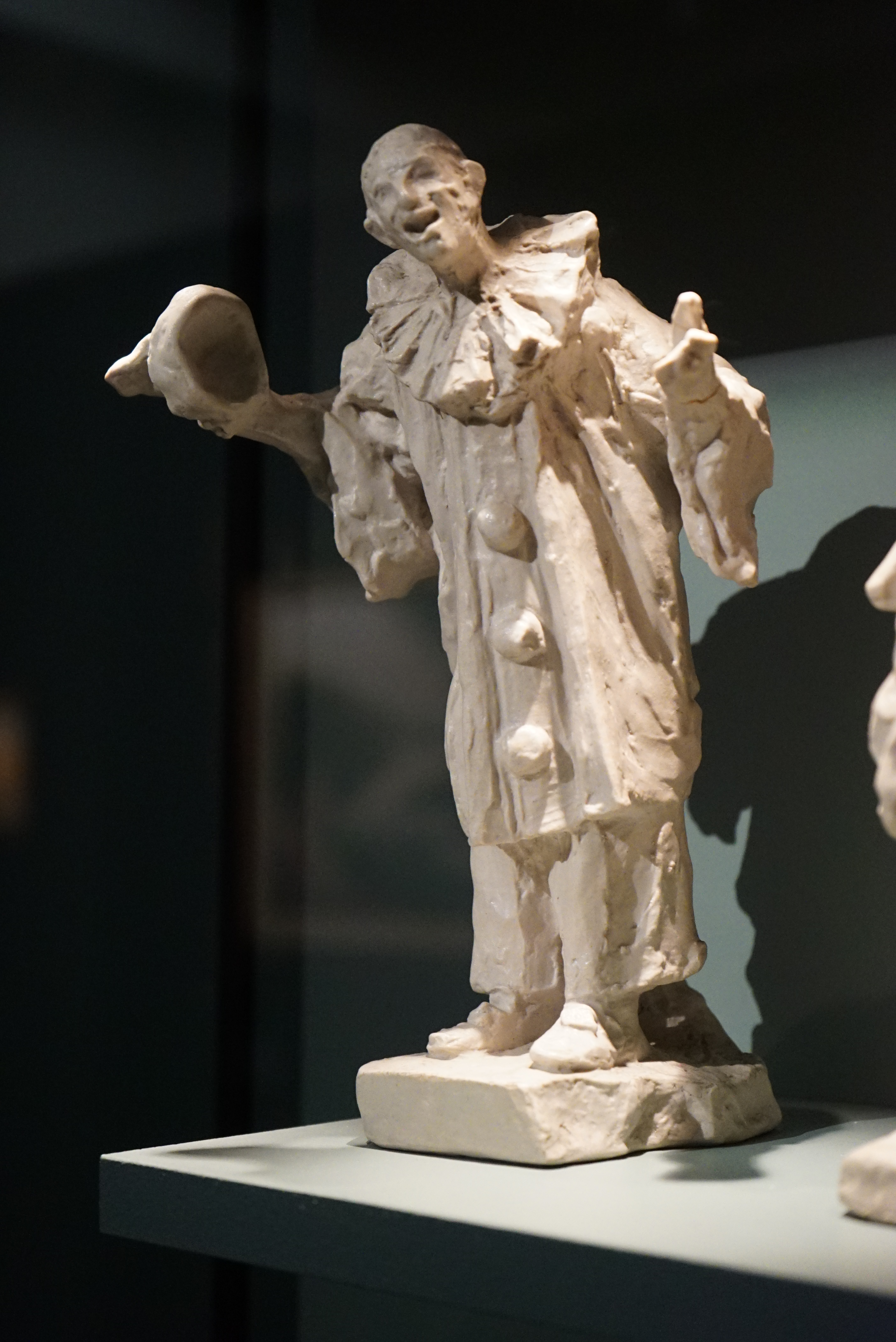
Figure of Salignac de l'opéra comique, by the brothers

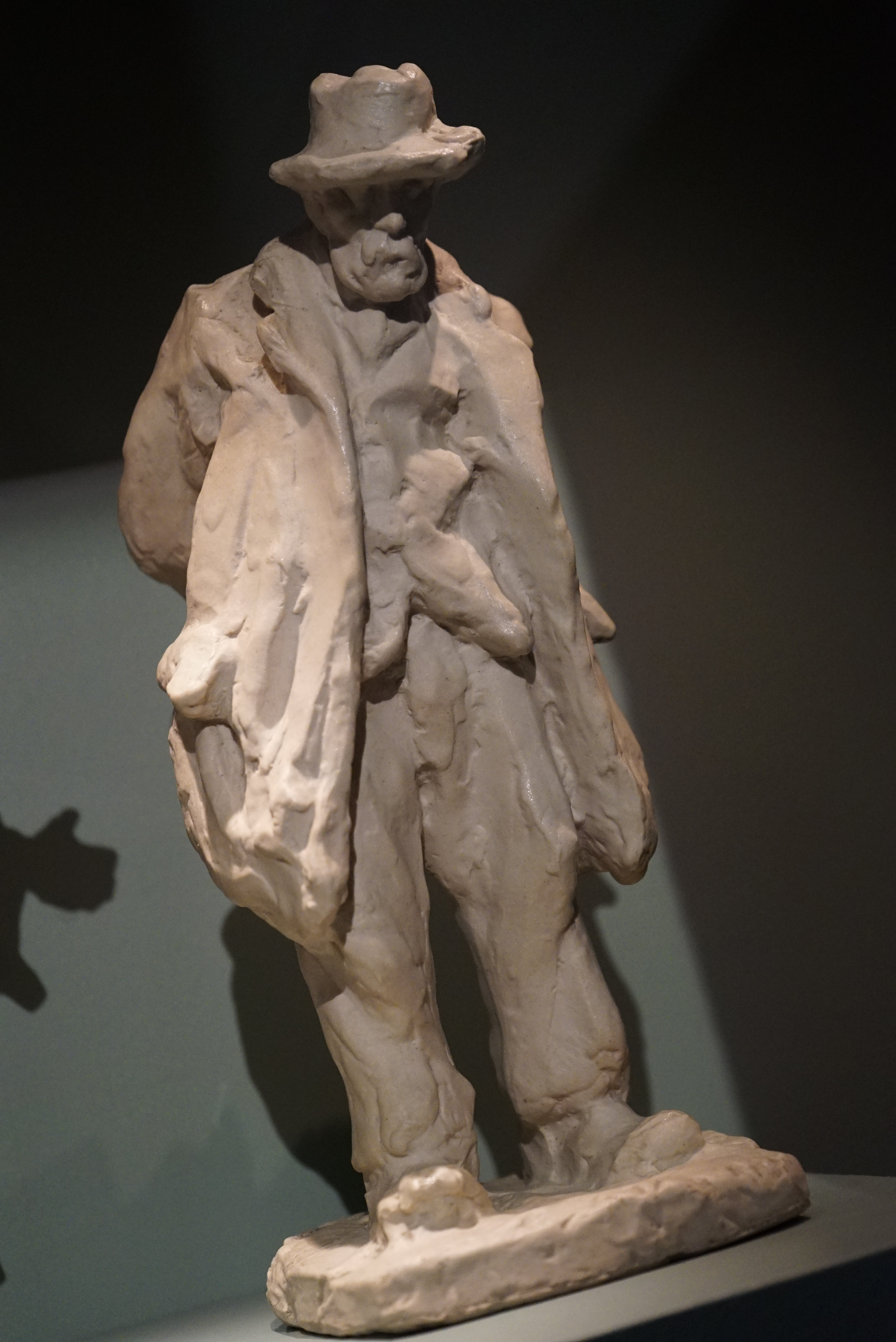
Figure

== Bibliography ==
- Jacques Peiffer (January 2001). Les Frères Mougin, sorciers du grand feu 1898-1950 (in French). Lunéville: Faton. p. 240. ISBN 978-2-87844-047-8. Mougin.
