= Auguste Majorelle =

French art dealer, decorator, ceramicist and cabinet maker

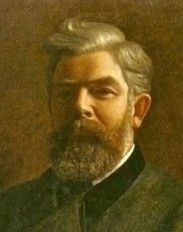
- Portrait of Auguste Majorelle by unknown artist
- Born: Joseph-Constant Auguste Majorelle; 1825; Lunéville, Lorraine, France
- Died: 1879 (aged 53–54); Nancy, France
- Occupations: Art dealer, ceramicist, cabinet-maker
- Known for: fine reproduction furniture in the 18th-century style and lacquer work

Auguste Majorelle (1825–1879) was a French art dealer, decorator, ceramicist and cabinet-maker, who established the Atelier d’Art de Decoration in Nancy, France. His son, Louis Majorelle, became one of the earliest modernist cabinet-makers and his grand-son, Jacques Majorelle, was a noted modernist-Orientalist painter.

== Life and career ==
Born Joseph-Constant Auguste Majorelle at Lunéville in 1825; he was the son of Jean Sylvestre Majorelle (1790-1864) and Aimée-Marie Larue (d.1830). Only scant documentary evidence is available in relation to Majorelle’s early career. He was trained in the decoration of faience pottery, which has led scholars to infer that he completed his apprenticeship at the Luneville Faience.

In 1858, shortly after his marriage to Marie Jenny Barbillon, he moved to Toul where he opened a business trading in objets d’art, in collaboration with Faïencerie Toul-Bellevue (Toul-Bellevue Pottery). He gradually moved into furniture making and set up a large and successful furniture factory in Toul.

In 1860, after the birth of his eldest son, Louis, the family relocated to Nancy permanently. By the mid 1800s, Nancy had become a prosperous town, where the local people could afford to spend on domestic consumption, such as furniture and household goods. The number of furniture manufacturers in Nancy increased markedly between 1860 and 1870. During this period, Nancy became an important centre for creative arts, artisans and intellectuals.

In Nancy, Majorelle opened an Atelier d’Art de Decoration, which sold ceramics, antiques, fabrics and reproductions of 18th century furniture, especially furniture in the style of Louis XV. He purchased items, some of which he decorated and many items of furniture sold in his atelier, were made in his factory.

He became highly skilled in lacquer work in the Asian style, which at the time was very popular with the upper middle classes. In 1861, he exhibited his lacquer furniture in the Chinese style at the Universal Exhibition. In 1864, he patented a ceramic lacquering technique and, in 1876, he patented a second method of hot enamelling on the inside of objects such as vases.

His oldest son Louis, after having assisted his father, assumed full control of the business after his father’s premature death.

== Gallery ==
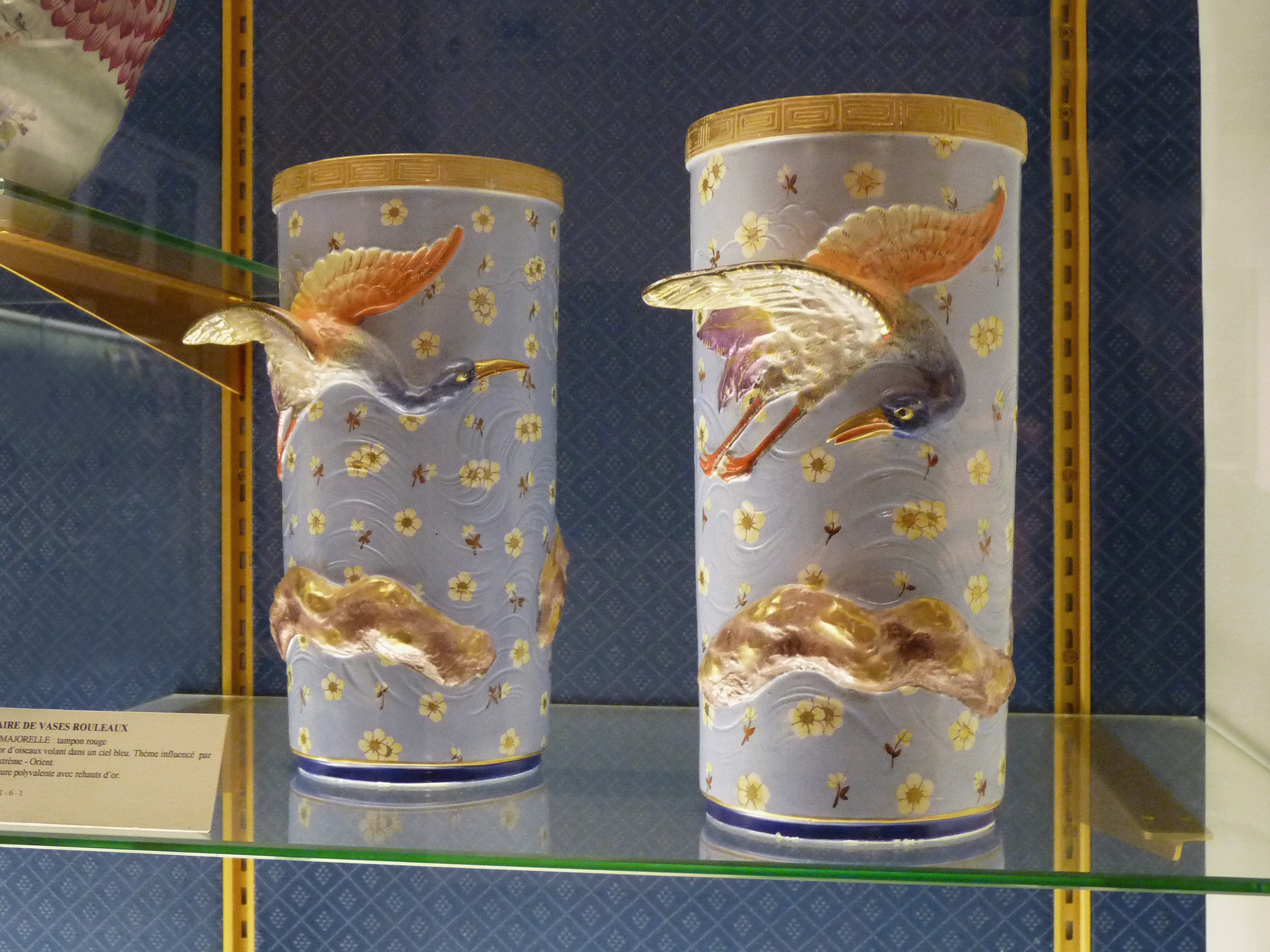
Pair of vases, undated

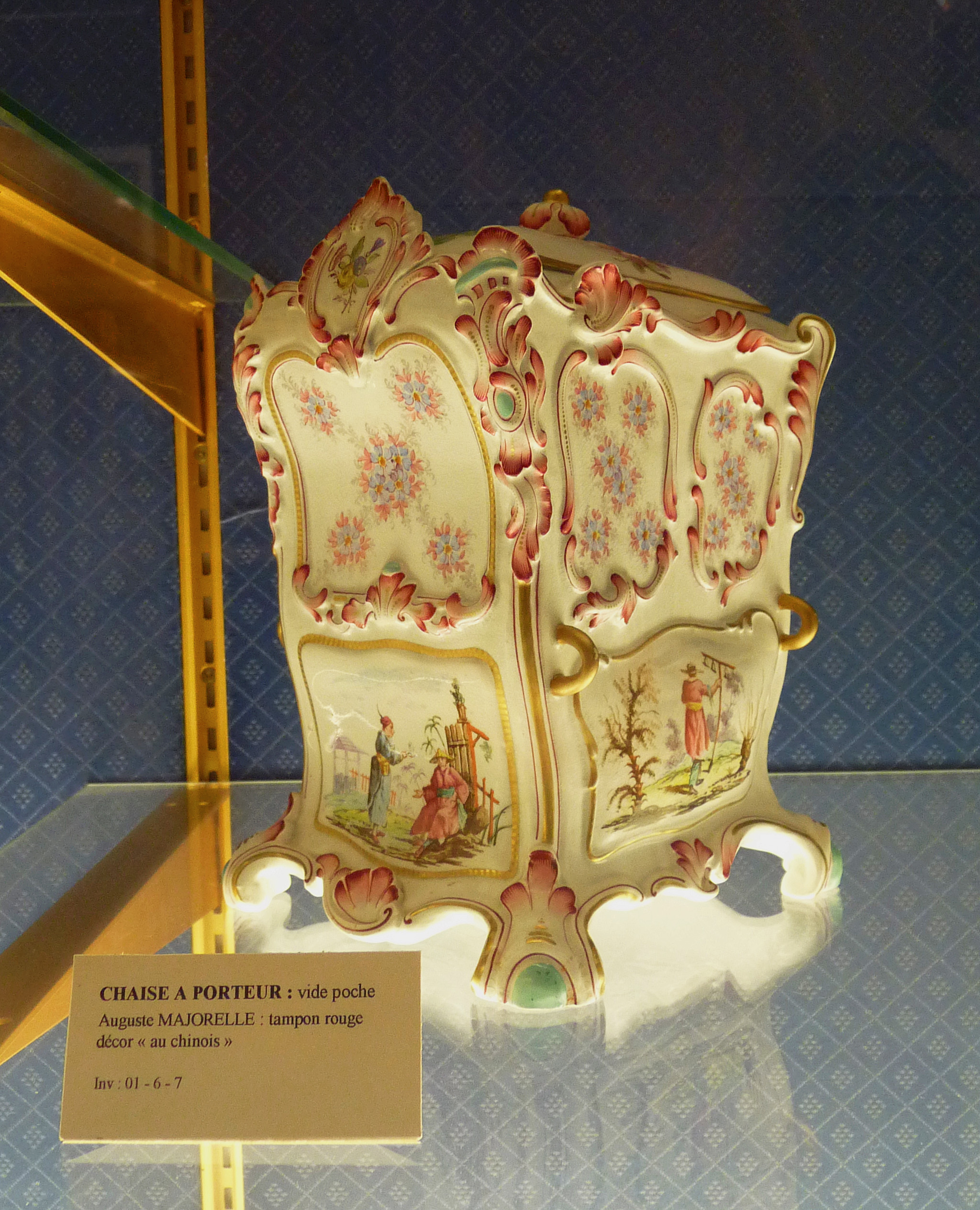
Chaise a porteur, undated

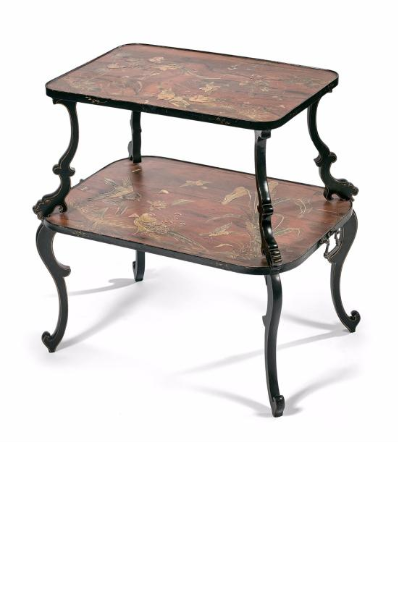
Lacquered tea table, undated

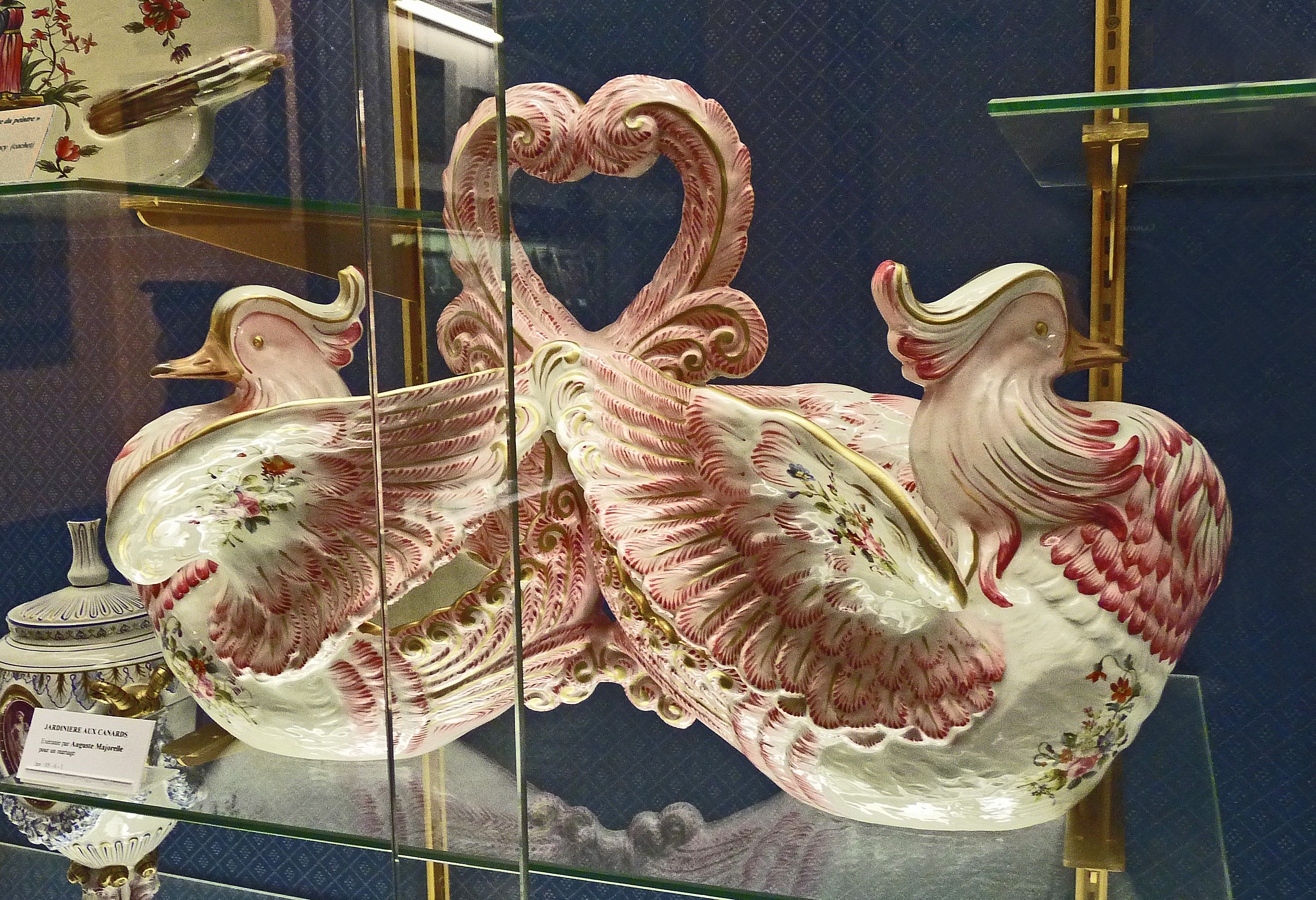
Jardiniere, undated

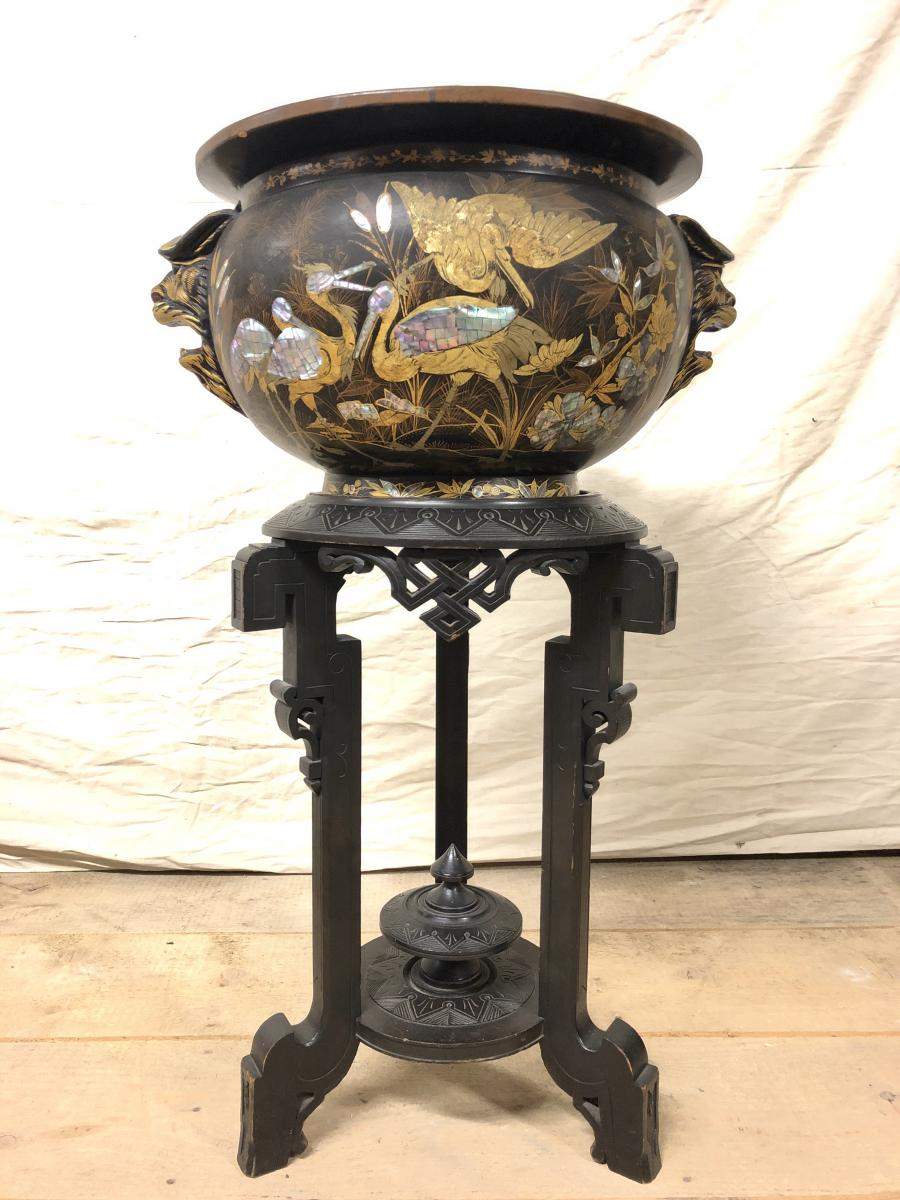
Jardiniere decorated in Japanese lacquer style

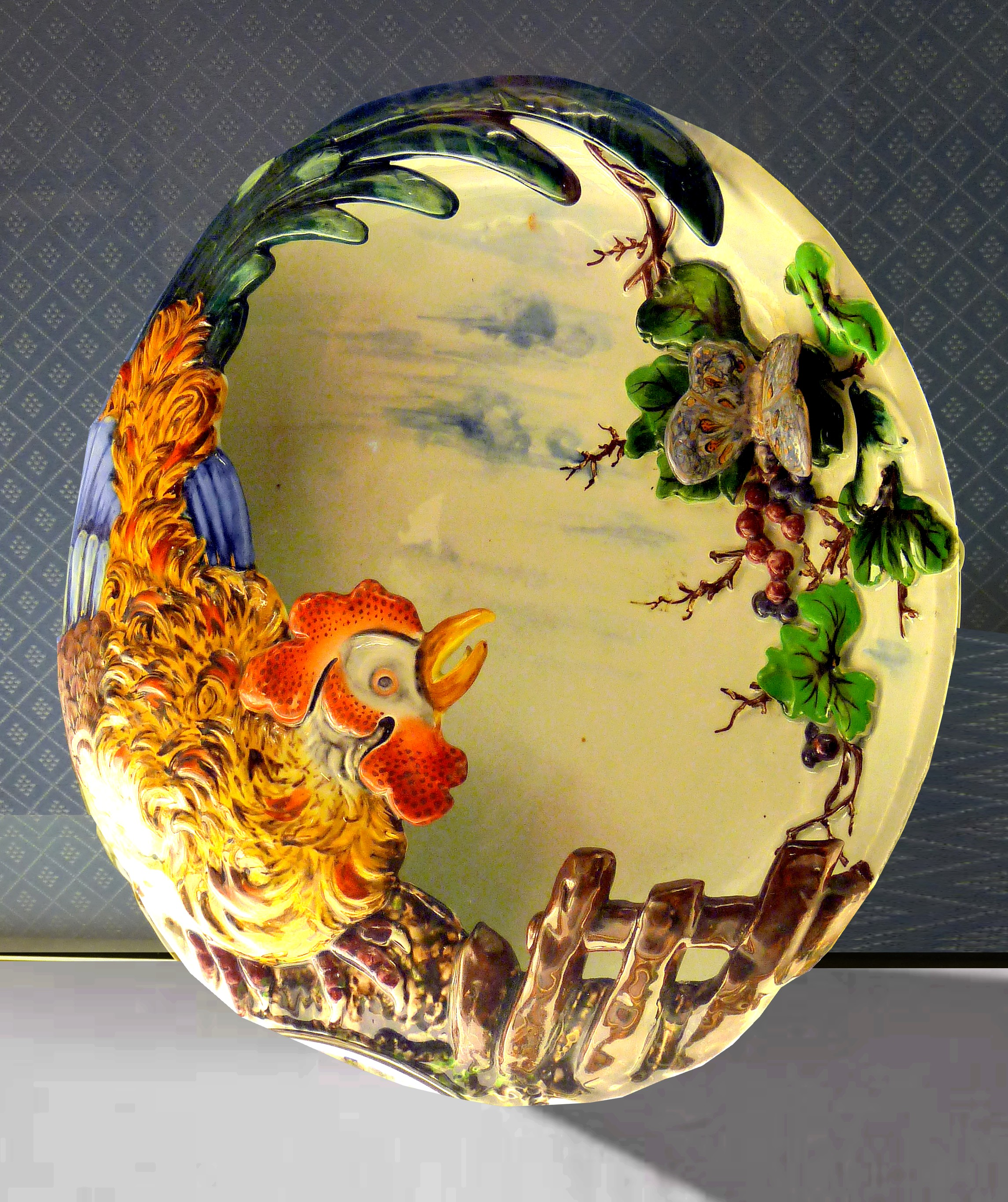
Ornamental ceramic dish, 1875, now in Charles de Bruyères Museum

== See also ==
- École de Nancy
- French porcelain
- Lacquer painting
- Louis XV furniture
- Luneville Faience
- Porcelain manufacturing companies in Europe (list)
- Villa Majorelle
