= Saint-Clément, Meurthe-et-Moselle =

Saint-Clément
- Commune
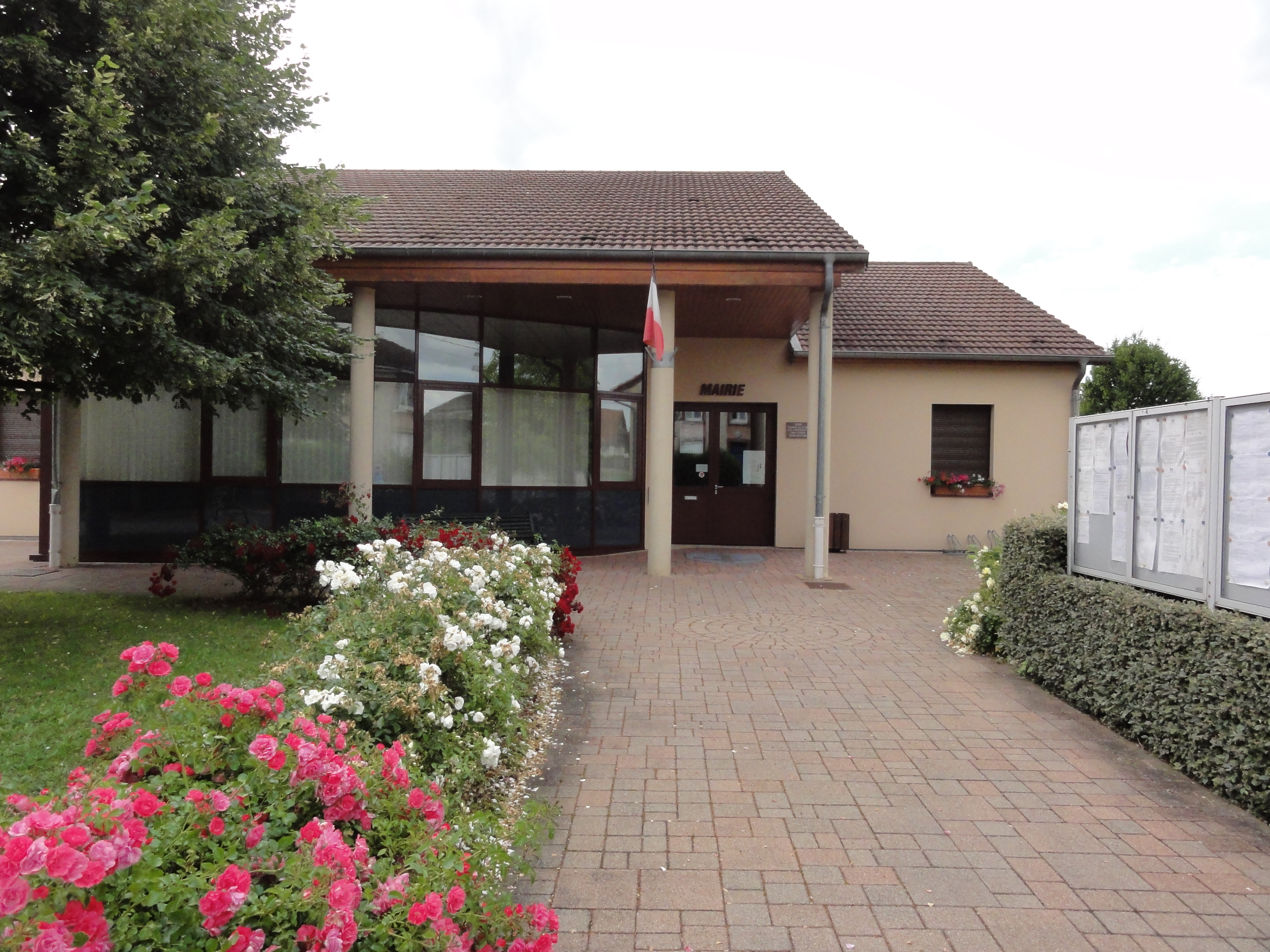
- The town hall in Saint-Clément

- Coat of arms
- Location of Saint-Clément
- Location within France Location within Grand Est
- Coordinates: 48°31′56″N 6°36′12″E
- Country: France
- Region: Grand Est
- Department: Meurthe-et-Moselle
- Arrondissement: Lunéville
- Canton: Baccarat

Government
  - Mayor (2020–2026): Gérard Ritz
- Area^{1}: 16.47 km^{2} (6.36 sq mi)
- Elevation: 250 m (820 ft)
- Highest elevation: 324 m (1,063 ft)
- Lowest elevation: 234 m (768 ft)
- Population (2023): 848
  - Density: 51.5/km^{2} (133/sq mi)
- Time zone: UTC+01:00 (CET)
  - Summer (DST): UTC+02:00 (CEST)
- INSEE/Postal code: 54472 /54950
- ^{1} French Land Register data, which excludes lakes, ponds, glaciers > 1 km^{2} (0.386 sq mi or 247 acres) and river estuaries.

Saint-Clément (French pronunciation: [sɛ̃ klemɑ̃]) is a commune in the Meurthe-et-Moselle department in north-eastern France. It was there that a sister company of the Lunéville Faience manufactory was founded by Jacques Chambrette in 1758. It still produces today both old & modern tableware and decorative ceramics.

== See also ==
- Communes of the Meurthe-et-Moselle department
