= Grand Hotel Moderne =

Hotel in Lourdes, France

The Grand Hotel Moderne
- Interactive map of the The Grand Hotel Moderne area

General information
- Location: Lourdes, France, 21 Avenue Bernadette Soubirous
- Coordinates: 43.096°N 0.0543°W
- Opening: 1896
- Owner: Tedesco family

Technical details
- Floor count: 5

Other information
- Number of rooms: 106
- Number of suites: 5
- Number of restaurants: 1 (Restaurant Majorelle)

Website
- grandhotelmoderne.com

The Grand Hotel Moderne is a 106 room four star hotel located in Lourdes, France.

== History ==
The hotel was built in 1896 by Jean Soubirous (the cousin of Saint Bernadette Soubirous) and his wife Benoite Toulet. The architect chosen to oversee the construction was Jean-Marie Lacrampe, who is also the same architect behind other structures in Lourdes including the town hall, the ramps to the Basilica of the Immaculate Conception and Castle Soum. At the time of its opening, the hotel was the first in the region to be equipped with an elevator and private bathrooms, hence its name "Le Moderne".

In 2007 the hotel was purchased by its current owners, the Tedesco family, an Italian tour operator who announced the immediate renovation that would bring "a second youth to the hotel". The reported 1.5 to 2.7 million of renovation works included the hydro-gommage of its baroque facade, modernizing all its guest rooms, and restoring the original woodwork of the art-nouveau designer Louis Majorelle in the hotel’s dining room and staircase.
