= Lunéville Faience =

French pottery manufacturer

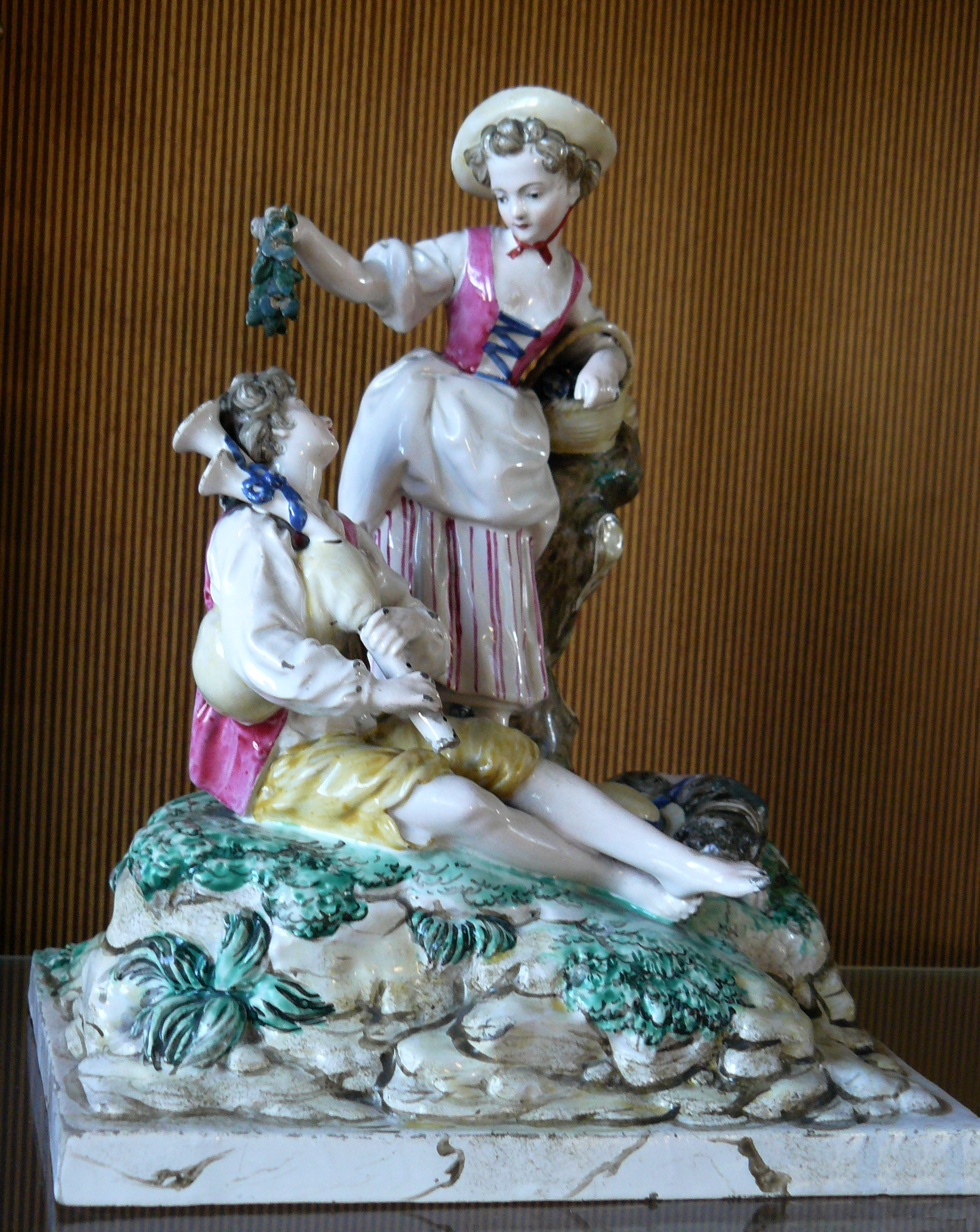
"Lady Crowning a Musician" c. 1770, Sèvres – Cité de la céramique France

Luneville Faience is one of the most famous French pottery manufacturers. It has been located in Lunéville, Lorraine, France since 1730.

== History ==
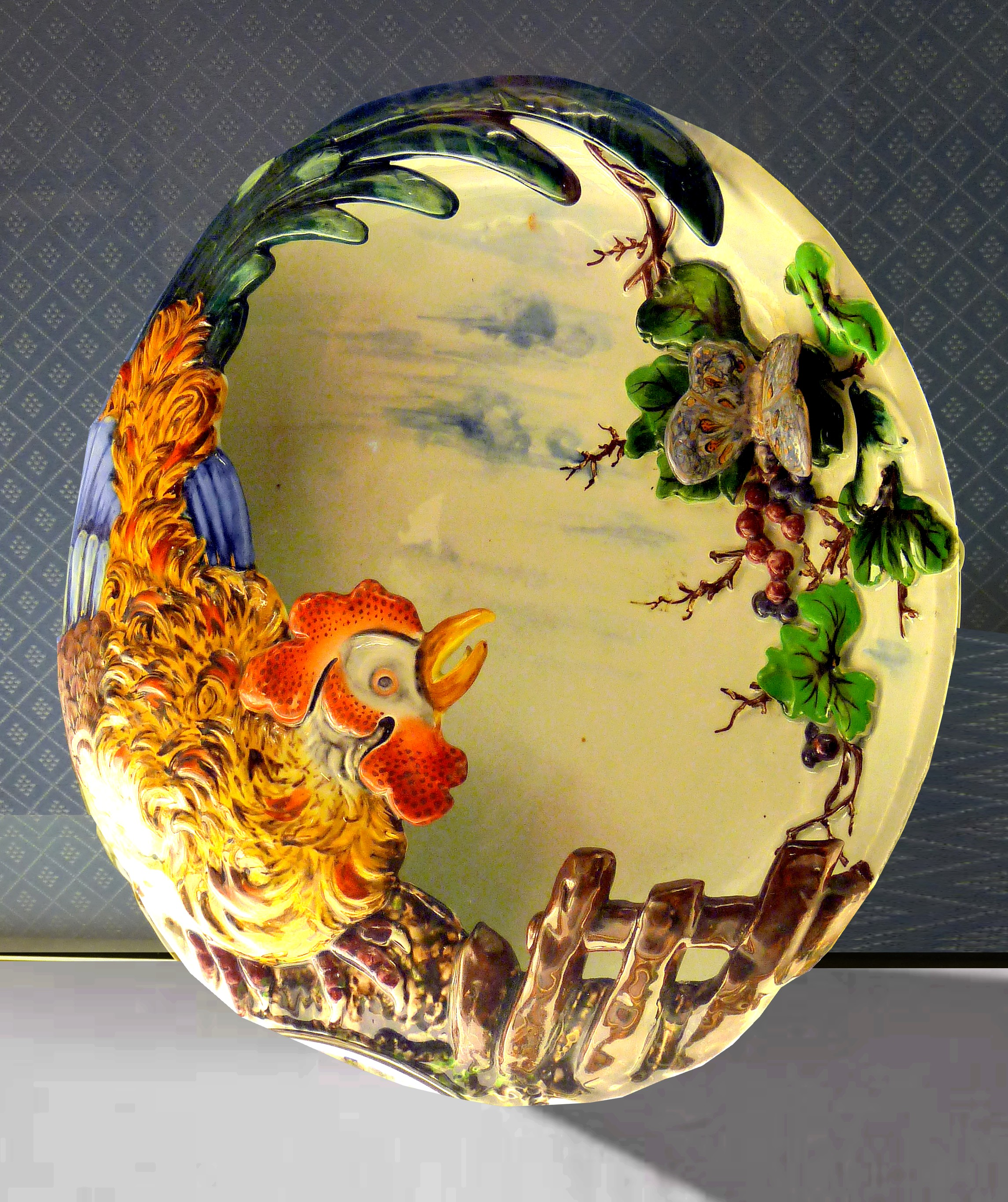
Auguste Majorelle, charger mid-19th century, Lunéville

Jacques Chambrette Senior initially started the first fine pottery works in Lorraine in 1711. His son began in 1722 by trading faience in Lunéville. He built his own factory there in 1730, just before he obtained ducal permission.

He formulated a new type of earthenware called "terre de Lorraine" in 1748 based on the study of English potteries. As soon as 1749, he was granted the label of official Royal manufactory by Stanislaus I, former king of Poland.

At the time, Lorraine being indeed an independent state, France levied heavy taxes on goods imported from there, which was the reason why Jacques Chambrette established as early as 1758 an additional factory in Saint-Clément, Meurthe-et-Moselle, only seven miles away, but located on French territory to escape those duties.

However, at the death of the founder, the two factories were split between the family and Richard Mique bought in 1763 the Saint-Clément part.

In 1786 Sébastien Keller bought Lunéville from the Chambrette family following the bankruptcy of the pottery manufacturer in 1785. For the next 137 years, the Keller family controlled the company. About 1832, Sébastien Keller's son aligned with his brother-in-law Guérin to give birth to the mark K&G (or KG) from the names Keller and Guérin.

In 1900, there were around 1,100 employees. The factory's products had a worldwide reputation and participated successfully in various fields of art and industrial exhibitions.

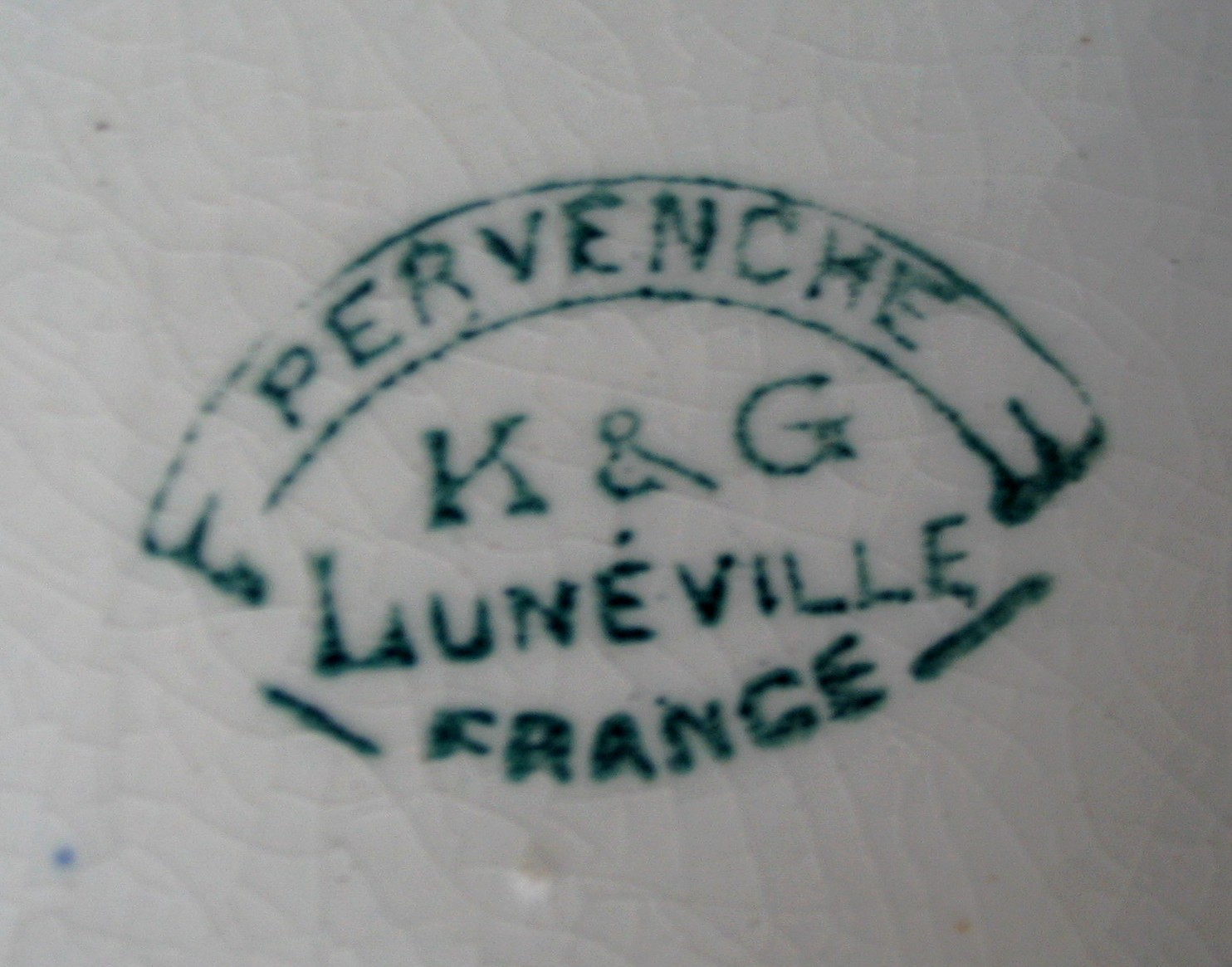
Stamp of Lunéville K & G (Keller et Guerin), early 20th century

== Developments since 1968 ==
The former pottery factory in Lunéville is now a company store, production continuing in Saint Clément.

== Some important products ==
- In 1746, the statue of Nicolas Ferry "le nain bébé" was offered to the royal court.
- 1770s - first vases designed by Richard Mique of Louis XV style of which he is one of the main proponents in his field. He also adorned the queen's hamlet at the Petit Trianon in Versailles with some vases that are still visible there today.

== List of some designers and other artists involved with Lunéville ==
- Charles-Adzir Trouillot
- Auguste Majorelle
- Jean-Baptiste Pillement
- Mougin brothers
- Géo Condé
- Ernest Bussière
- Émile Gallé
- Paul-Louis Cyfflé

== See also ==
- Porcelain manufacturing companies in Europe
