= Louis Majorelle =

French furniture maker, decorator, and artist-craftsman (1859–1926)

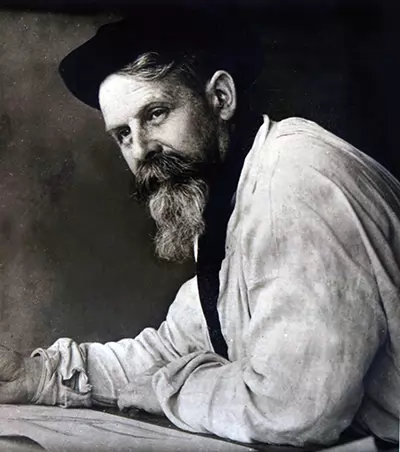
- Picture of Louis Majorelle, undated photograph.
- Born: Louis-Jean-Sylvestre Majorelle; 26 September 1859; Toul, France
- Died: 15 January 1926 (aged 66); Nancy, France
- Resting place: Cimetière de Préville, Nancy, France
- Occupations: furniture maker; decorator; artist-craftsman
- Spouse: Marie Léonie Jane Kretz (m. 1885; died 1912)
- Children: 1, Jacques Majorelle

Louis-Jean-Sylvestre Majorelle, usually known simply as Louis Majorelle, (26 September 1859 – 15 January 1926) was a French decorator and furniture designer who manufactured his own designs, in the French tradition of the ébéniste. He was one of the designers of furniture in the Art Nouveau style, and after 1901 formally served as one of the vice-presidents of the École de Nancy.

Louis Majorelle dressed the structure of Art Nouveau furniture with exotic wood inlays.

Majorelle worked with a wide range of native and imported timbers. Oak, walnut, ash, elm, holly, plane, chestnut, cherry, pear and beech were used to create subdued tones and subtle grey hues forming the basis of his monochrome compositions. Rosewood, lemonwood, silver maple, amaranth, jacaranda, satinwood, amourette, clairembourg, ebony and palmwood provided a broader palette of colours and natural grain patterns allowing him greater visual richness in his designs.

== Early life ==
Majorelle was born in Toul. In 1861, his father, Auguste Majorelle (1825 – 1879), who himself was a furniture designer and manufacturer, moved the family from Toul to Nancy. There, Louis finished his initial studies before moving to Paris in 1877 for two years of work at the École des Beaux-Arts. On the death of his father, he cut short his studies and returned to Nancy to oversee the family's manufactories of faience and furniture. This would occupy him for the rest of his life.

On 7 April 1885, Majorelle married Marie Léonie Jane Kretz (06/12/1864 – 31/12/1912), daughter of the director of the municipal theaters in Nancy. Their only child, Jacques Majorelle, who himself would become an artist, was born 7 March 1886.

== Direction of the Family Firm ==
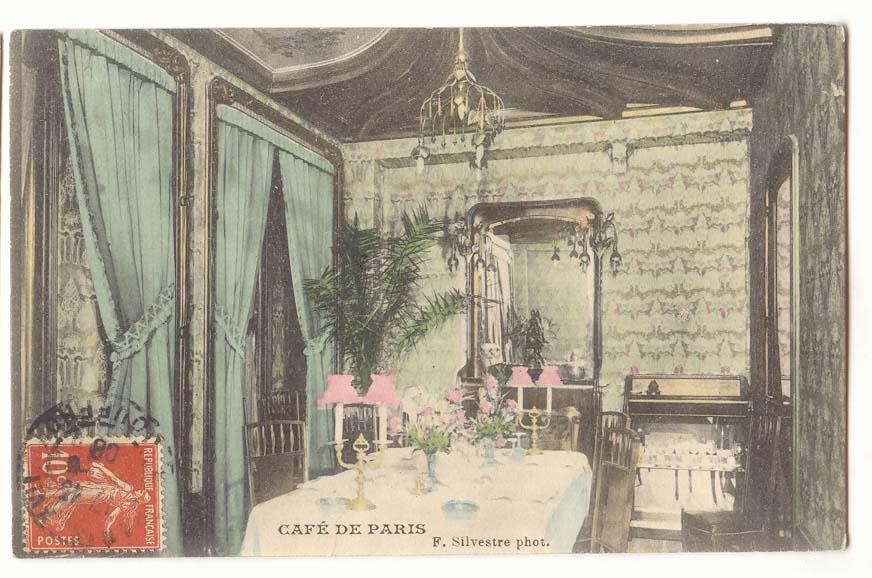
Salon du Café de Paris designed by Louis Majorelle in 1898

The Majorelle firm's factory was designed by famous École de Nancy architect Lucien Weissenburger (1860 – 1929) and located at 6, rue du Vieil-Aître in the western part of Nancy. In the 1880s Majorelle turned out pastiches of Louis XV furniture styles, which he exhibited in 1894 at the Exposition d'Art Décoratif et Industriel [Exposition of Decorative and Industrial Art] in Nancy, but the influence of the glass- and furniture-maker Emile Gallé (1846 – 1904) inspired him to take his production in new directions. Beginning in the 1890s, Majorelle's furniture, embellished with inlays, took their inspiration from nature: stems of plants, waterlily leaves, tendrils, dragonflies. Before 1900 he added a metalworking atelier to the workshops, to produce drawerpulls and mounts in keeping with the fluid lines of his woodwork. His studio also was responsible for the ironwork of balconies, staircase railings, and exterior details on many buildings in Nancy at the turn of the twentieth century. Some of his original woodwork designs can still be found in Grand Hotel Moderne, Lourdes. Often collaborating on lamp designs with the Daum Frères glassworks of Nancy, he helped make the city one of the European centers of Art Nouveau. At the apogee of the Belle Époque, during the 1900 Paris World's Fair (Exposition Universelle), Majorelle's designs triumphed and drew him an international clientele. By 1910, Majorelle had opened shops for his furniture in Nancy, Paris, Lyon, and Lille.

== Majorelle and the École de Nancy ==
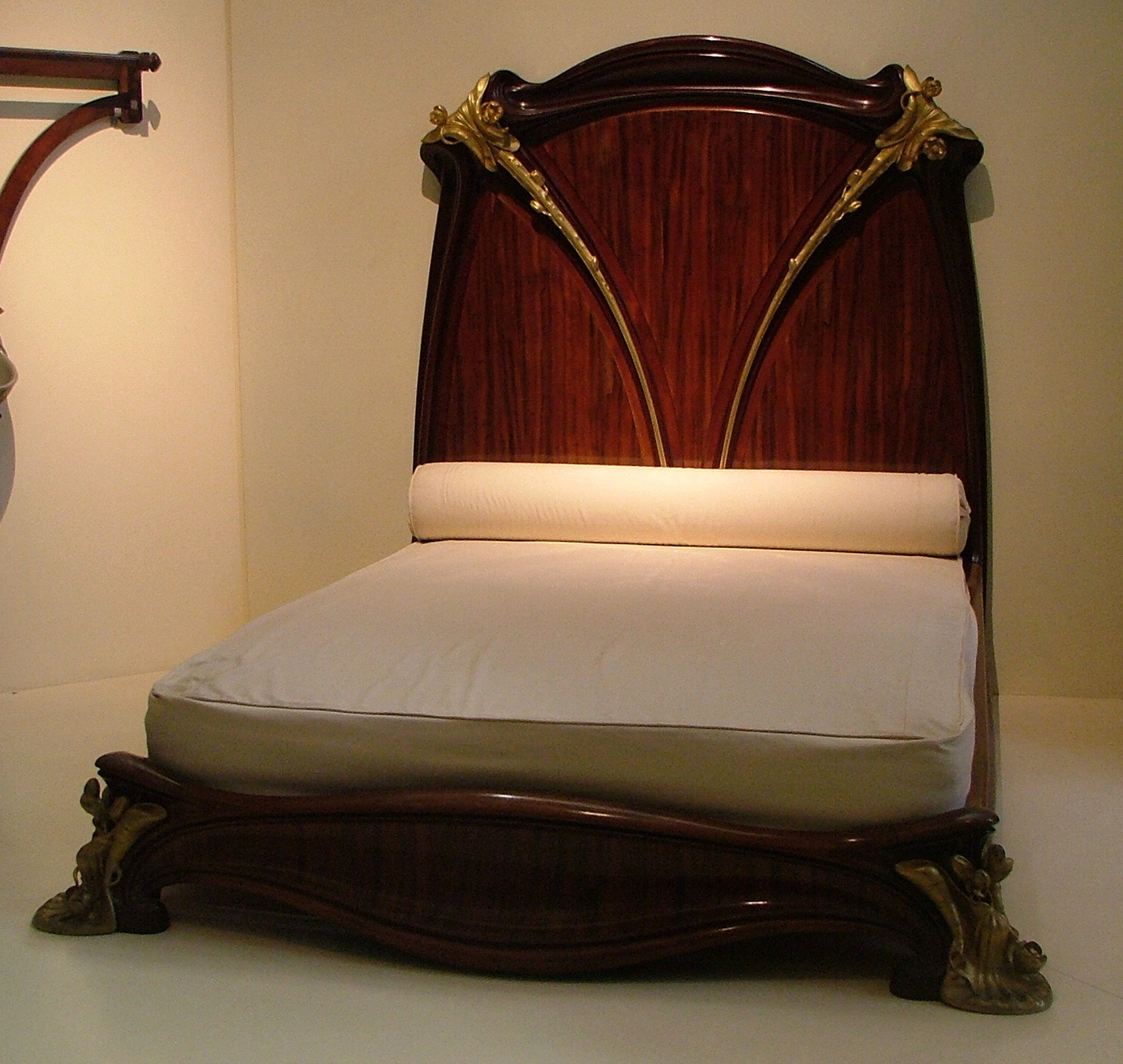
A mahogany bed, known as the Nénuphar bed for its water lily motifs, designed and manufactured by Louis Majorelle around 1902–3, on display at the Musée d'Orsay, Paris.

In February 1901, Majorelle became one of the founding members of the École de Nancy, alternatively known as the Alliance provinciale des industries d'art, which was a group of artists, architects, art critics, and industrialists in Lorraine who decided to work in a collaborative fashion, and predominantly in the Art Nouveau style. They, headed by Gallé (until his death in 1904, and thereafter by Victor Prouvé) did this for several reasons, chief among which was to ensure a high standard of quality of work in the French decorative arts, of which Lorraine artists were the chief producers at the time. Majorelle was one of the vice-presidents of the group from the outset, remained so throughout the existence of the École de Nancy, and was certainly considered one of the group's leaders. For the most part, he and the other members worked to promote the work of Lorraine decorative artists through their advocacy of the establishment of a school for industrial arts, their participation at major exhibitions (as well as organizing their own shows), and through their collaborative efforts on individual art pieces and buildings, almost all of which were in the Art Nouveau style, and which helped produce to some extent a unity among the art and architecture produced by Lorrainers. Majorelle was consistently one of the internationally renowned figures of the group who could always be found at any show at which the group exhibited. His connections with the Parisian art circles also helped assure the renown of Lorraine artists in the French capital. The École de Nancy, however, was often in short supply of funding, and the formal artistic cooperation among its members slowly seemed to disintegrate during the First World War.

== The Villa Majorelle ==
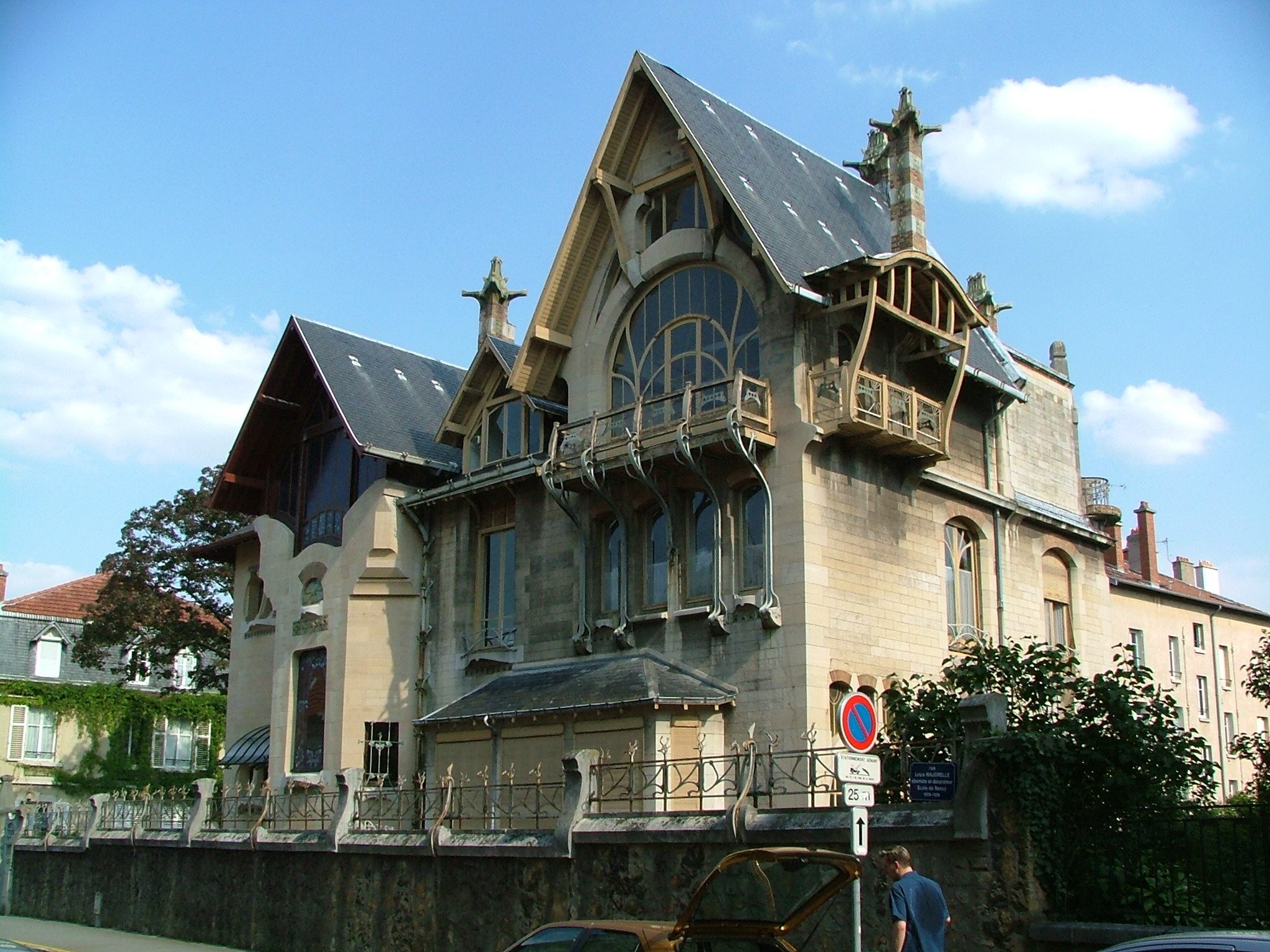
The Villa Majorelle, located at 1, rue Louis Majorelle in Nancy, in July 2004.

In 1898, Majorelle hired Henri Sauvage (1873 – 1932), a young Parisian architect, to collaborate with Weissenburger on the building of his own house, known as the Villa Jika (after the acronym of Majorelle's wife's maiden name), but now popularly known as simply the Villa Majorelle, in Nancy. Majorelle, like many industrialists in Nancy, located his house across the street from his factory, but in a relatively new area of town; the large parcel of land which it occupied made it seem like a veritable country estate. His house and factory were located on land that was given to him by his mother-in-law, Madame Kretz.

Sauvage and Weissenburger's three-story design for the villa represents the true flowering of Art Nouveau architecture in Nancy, with multiple bow windows and floral motifs covering the exterior. Majorelle himself produced the ironwork, furniture, and the interior woodwork, such as the grand staircase. Majorelle located his own personal studio on the third floor under a gabled roof, and included a huge arched window combled together with spandrels that evoke the branches of a tree or flower. Most of the floral motifs seen in the house use the forms of the monnaie-du-pape plant. In addition, Majorelle employed Jacques Gruber to create the original stained glass for the house, and on the interior, the artisans created impressive painted friezes in the dining room, which contains a large ceramic Art Nouveau fireplace designed by Alexandre Bigot.

== World War I and Majorelle's Late career ==
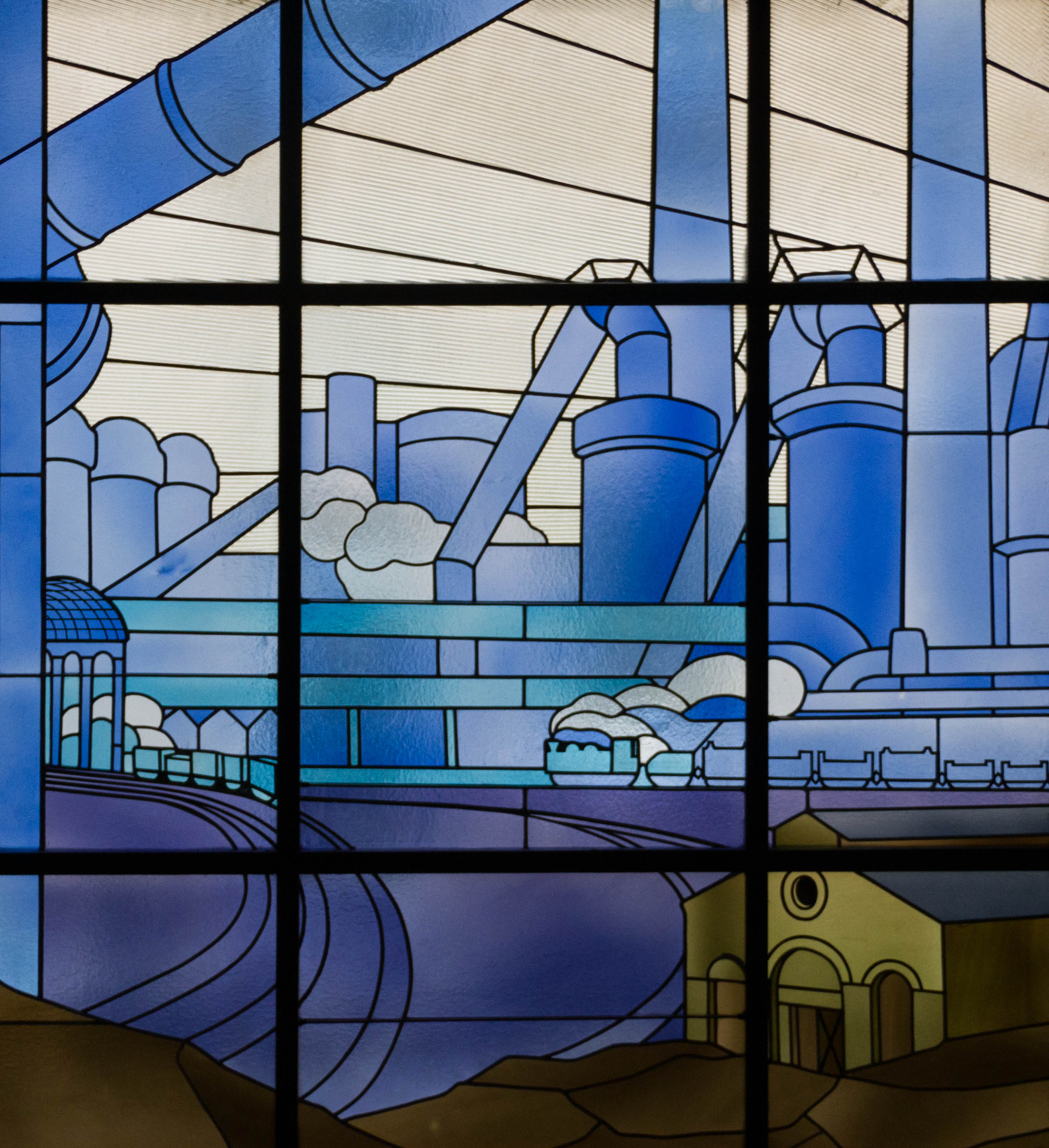
Stained glass window, headquarters of the Longwy steel factory

In 1914, with the outbreak of war, Majorelle hoped to hold out and continue production in Nancy. Unfortunately, in an event apparently unrelated to the war, his factories on the rue du Vieil-Aître suddenly caught fire on the morning of 20 November 1916. The conflagration, no doubt spurred on by the fresh supply of lumber, unfinished furniture, and sawdust, burned virtually all the firm's sketches, awards, molds, equipment, and archives that documented the fifty-year history of the enterprise. As if to add insult to injury, a year later, in 1917 German aircraft bombing of Nancy destroyed the Majorelle shop on the rue Saint-Georges. The Majorelle family reported that their shop in Lille had been looted by advancing German troops.

Majorelle relocated to Paris for the remainder of the war, where he worked in the workshops of fellow furniture designers. After the war, he reopened the factory and his shop, and continued to collaborate with the Daum glassworks and produce furniture, though these late designs show the stiffened geometry of Art Deco.

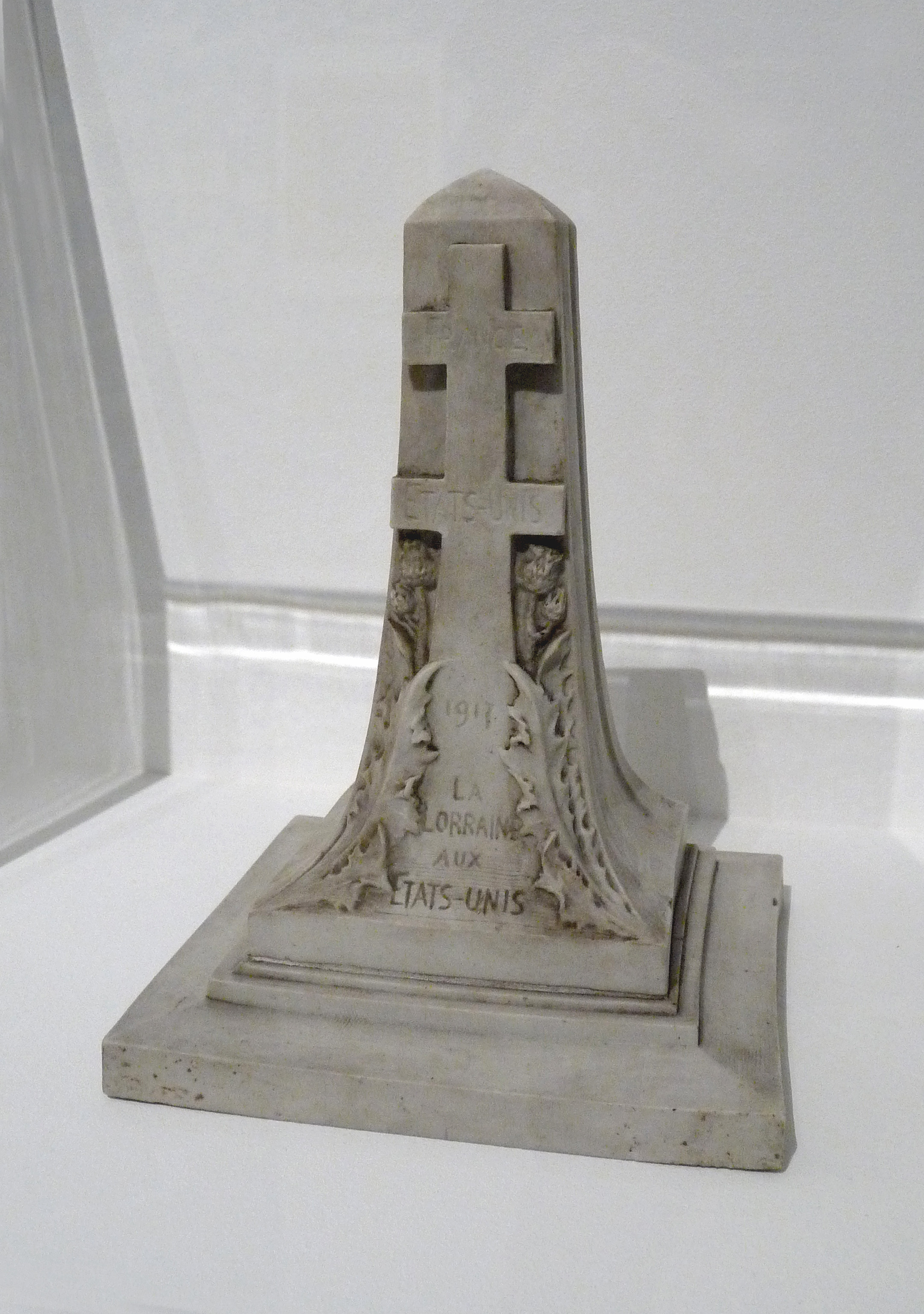
French monument by subscription for the 1st three American soldiers killed in action in World War I. This is a model of the actual monument in Lorraine destroyed by the invading Germans in 1940.

Majorelle died in Nancy in 1926 in his beautiful property on rue du Vieil-Aître, leaving to his brothers Jules and Pierre, the management of the store on rue Saint-Georges in Nancy and the sawmill of Bouxières-aux-Dames. After his death, his family, whose fortunes had been damaged severely by the war, could no longer afford to live in the Villa Majorelle, and the house and much of the outlying property were sold off in parcels. Majorelle's factories closed in 1931. Eventually, the villa went through several architectural modifications (aside from those Majorelle himself made while he resided there), including the addition of a concrete bunker near the rear and the enclosure of the front terrasse. The large stone fence and gate that surrounded the property were eventually reduced to a small piece around the house, which itself went through various uses and owners over the next century. Today, the Villa has been acquired by the city of Nancy, which is undertaking a long-term project of renovation and restoration.

== Cultural references ==
Majorelle's work, particularly the Aux Orchidées mahogany and amourette desk with gilt-bronze mounts from the Musée d'Orsay, is featured prominently in the 2008 French Film L'heure d'été, released in the US as Summer Hours in 2009.

== Works by Louis Majorelle ==
Furniture

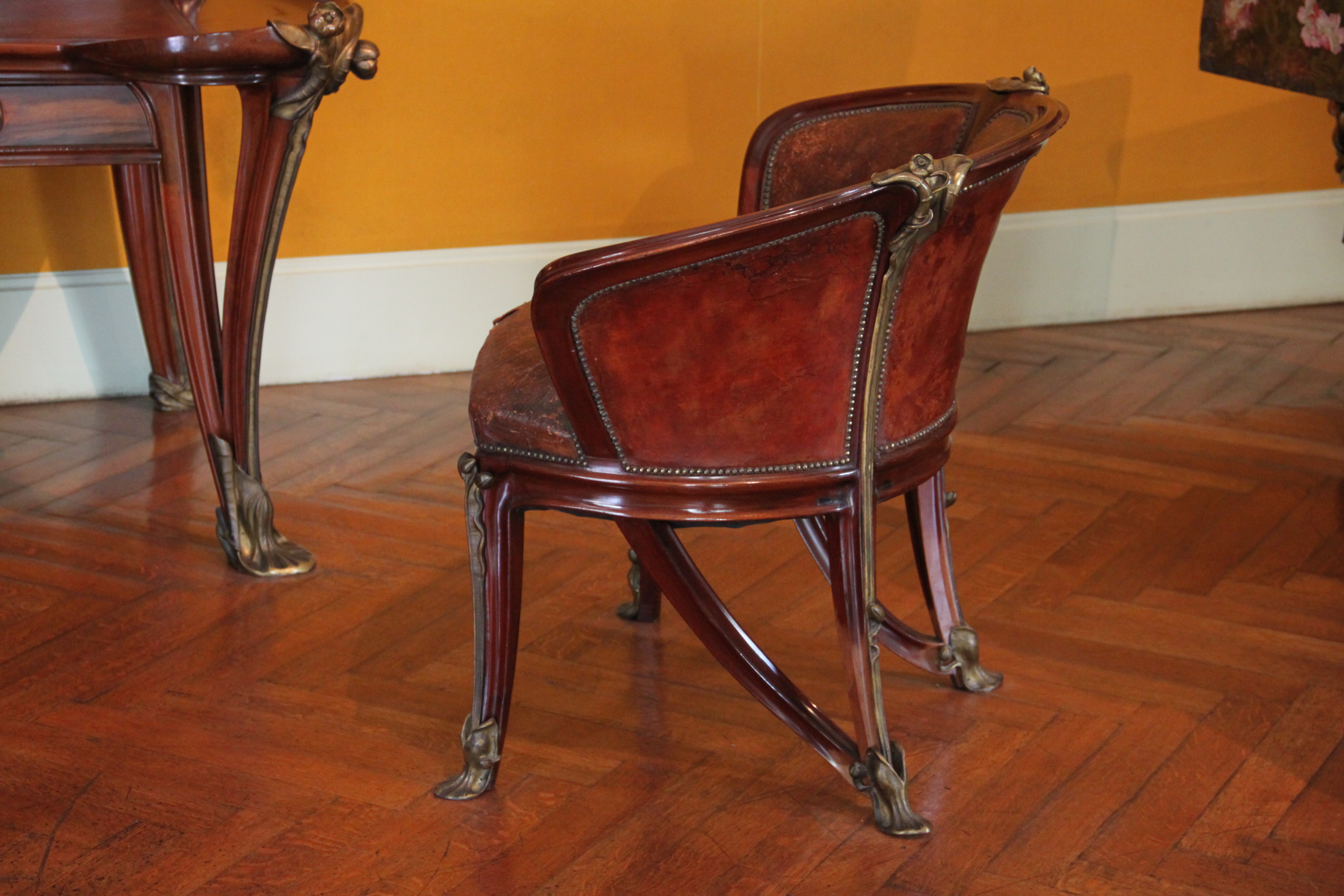
Aux Nénuphars armchair (Musée de l'École de Nancy).

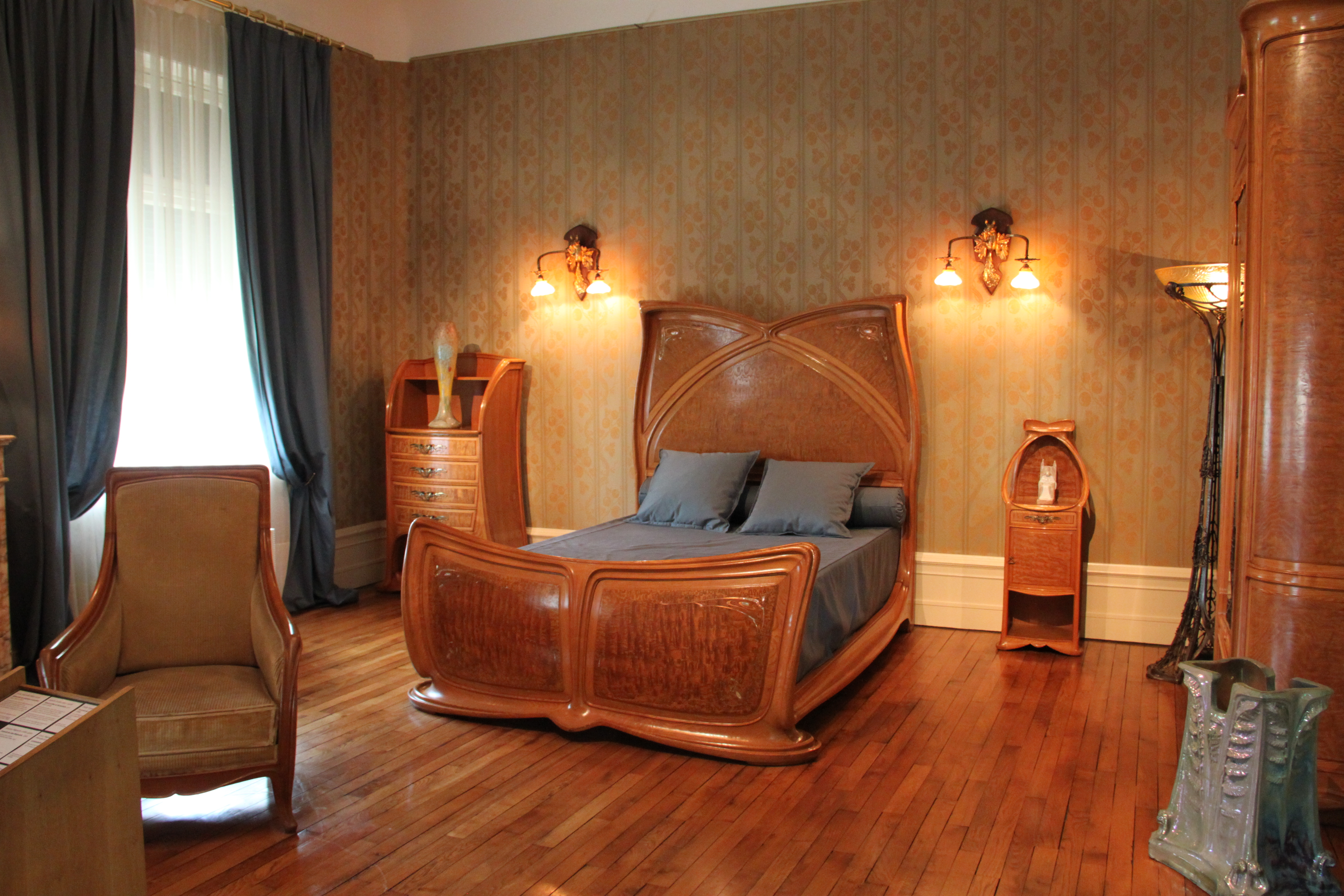
Bedroom furniture designed specifically for the Villa Majorelle.

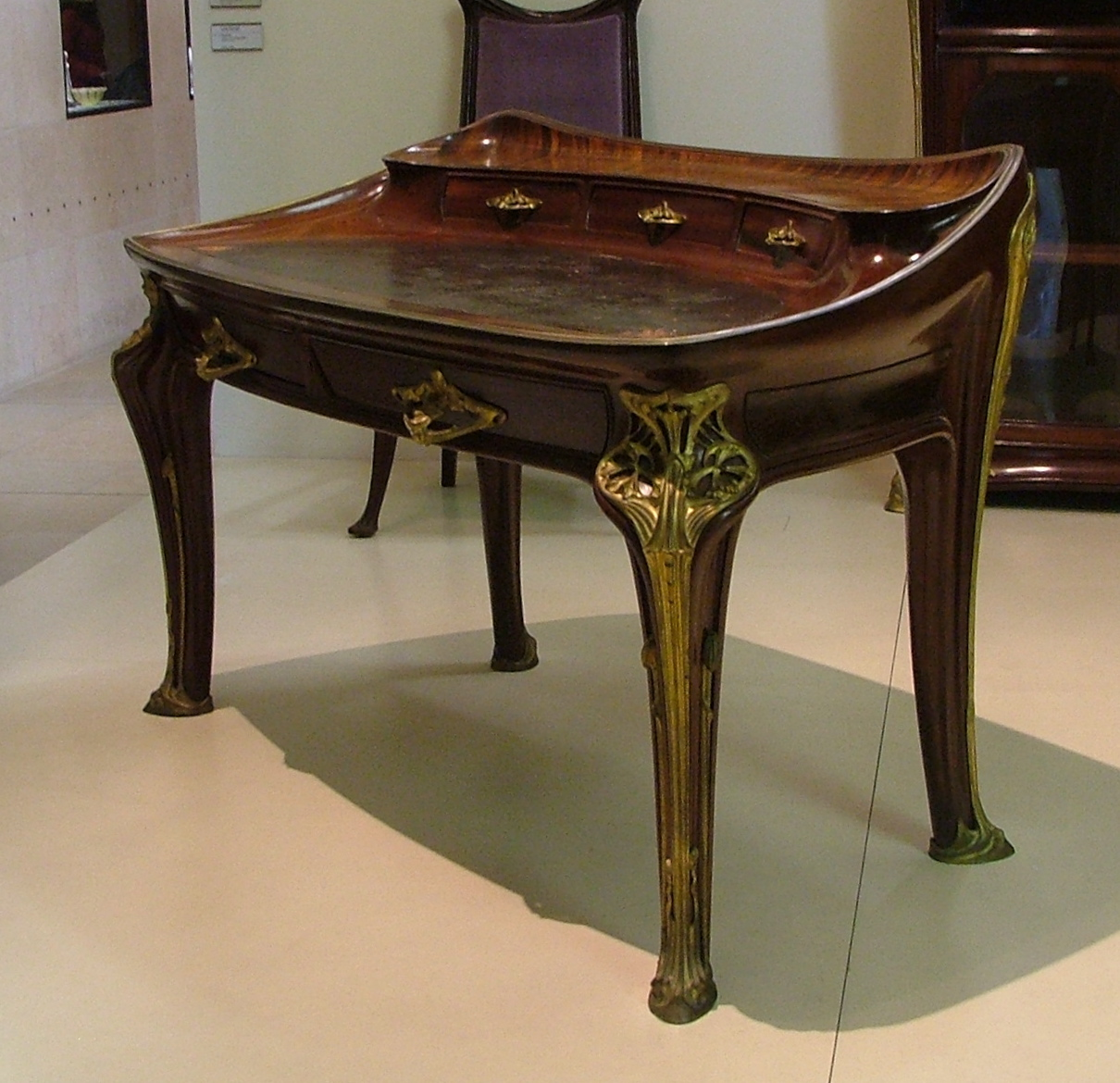
Aux Orchidées desk designed and manufactured by Louis Majorelle in 1902-3 (Musée d'Orsay).

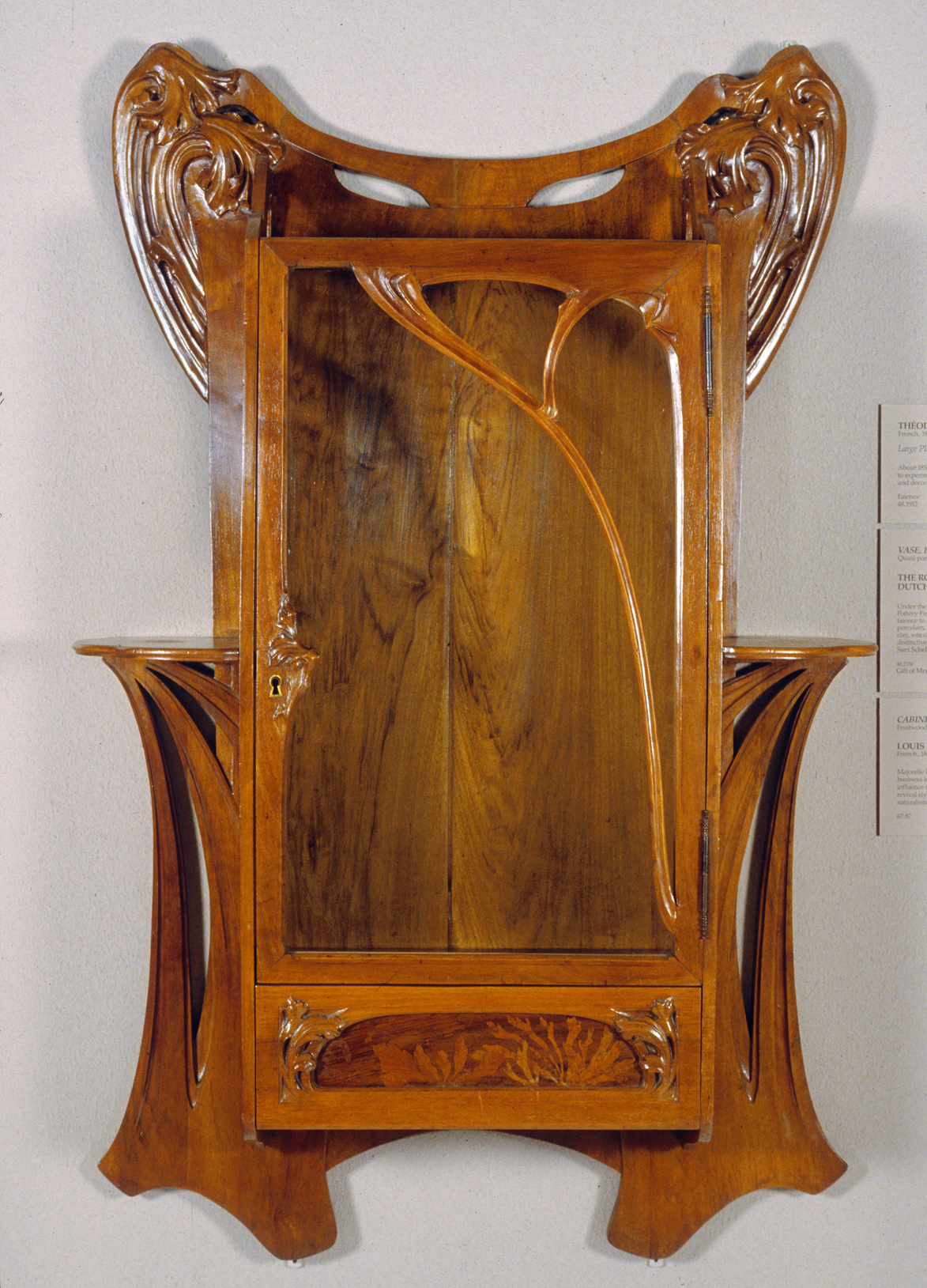
Louis Majorelle - Wall Cabinet
(Walters Art Museum)
Stained Glass

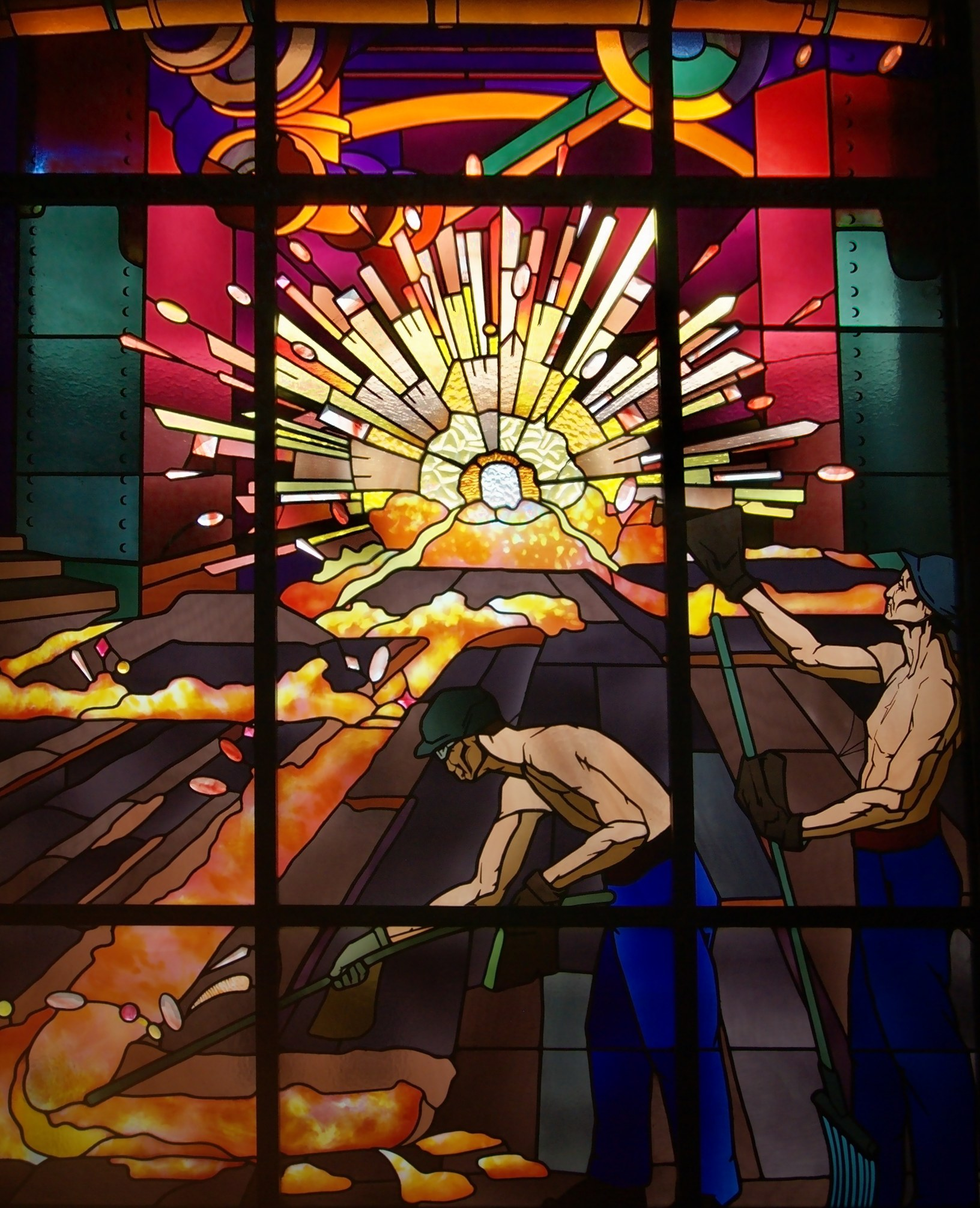

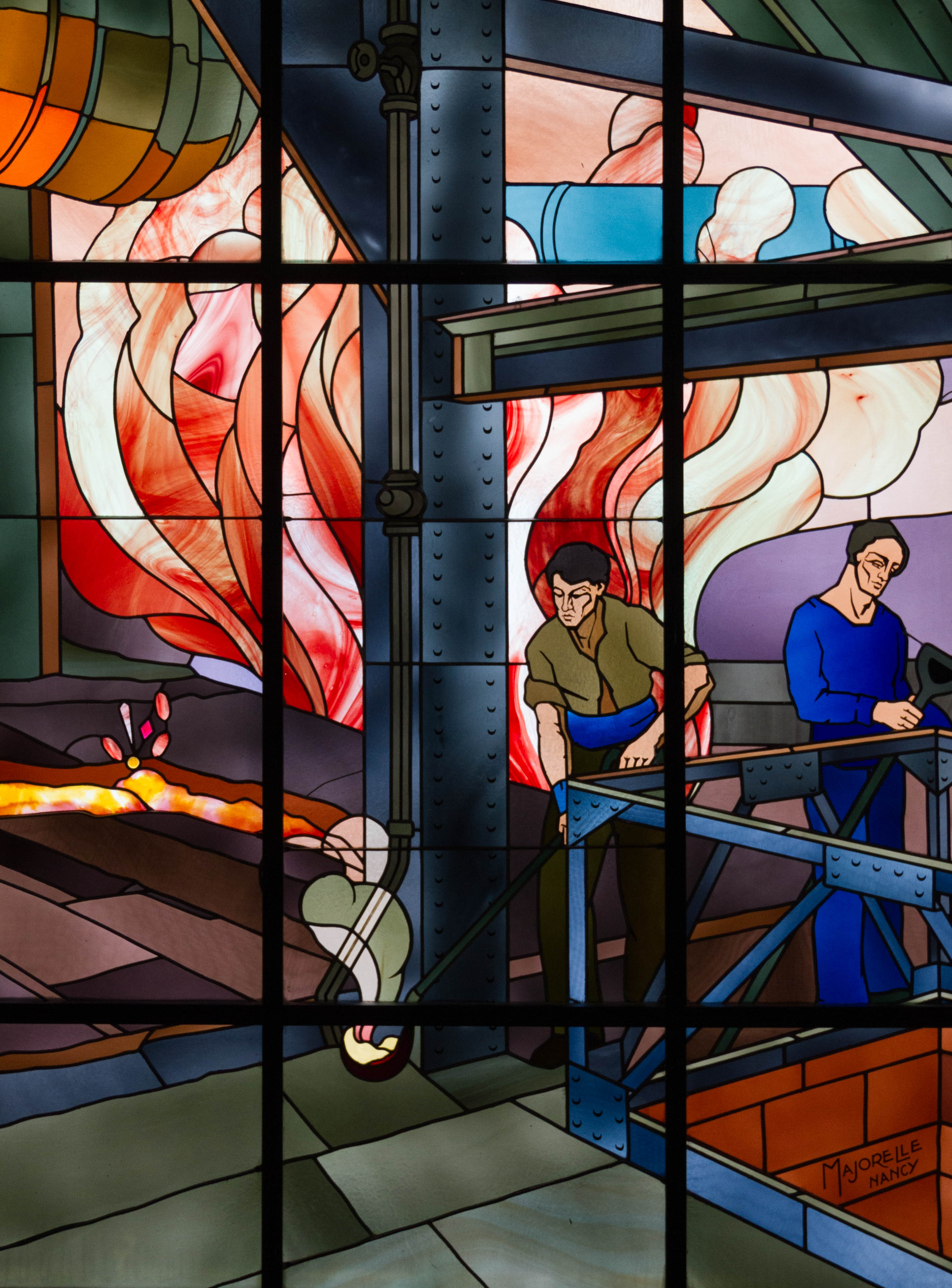

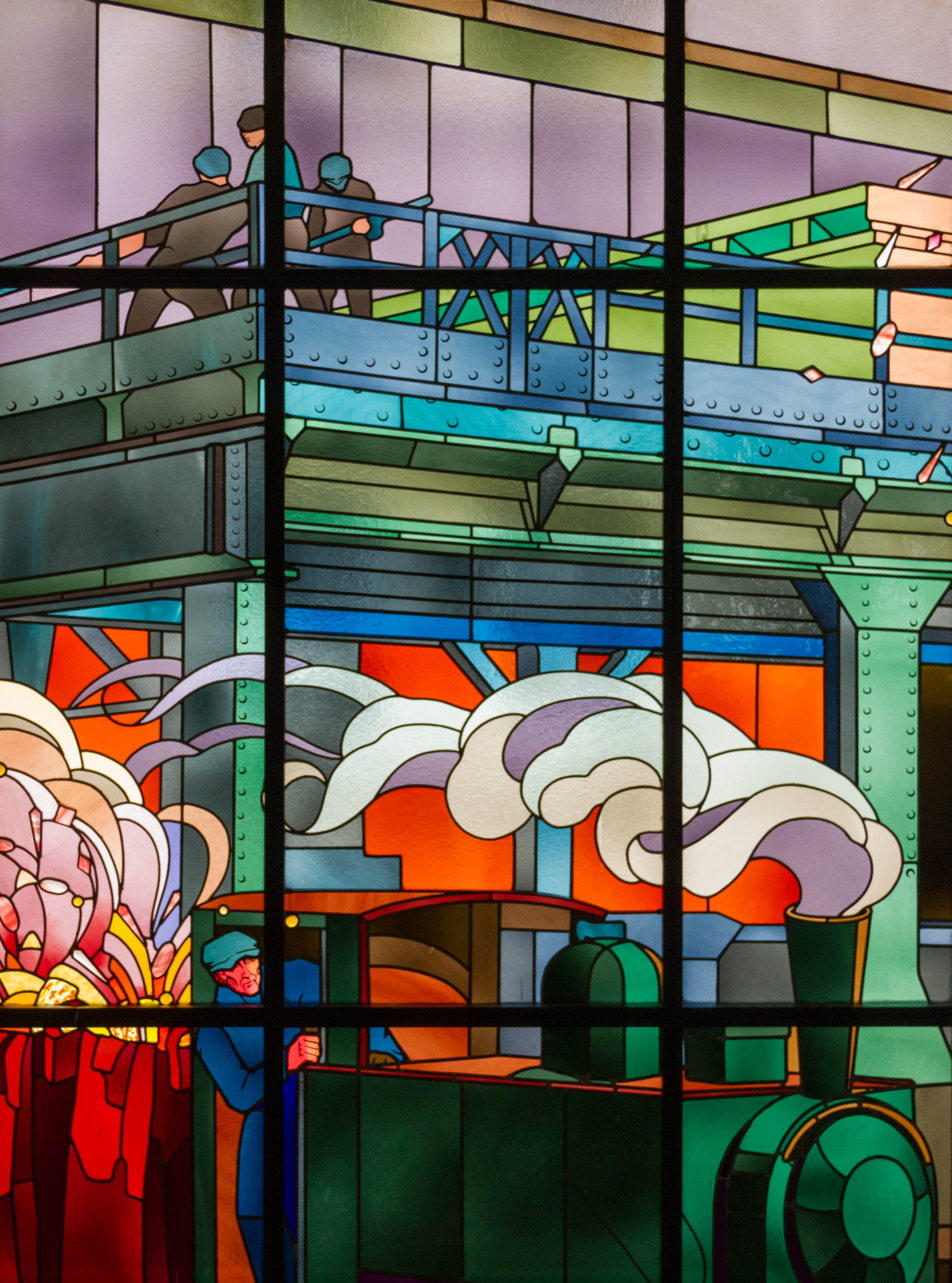

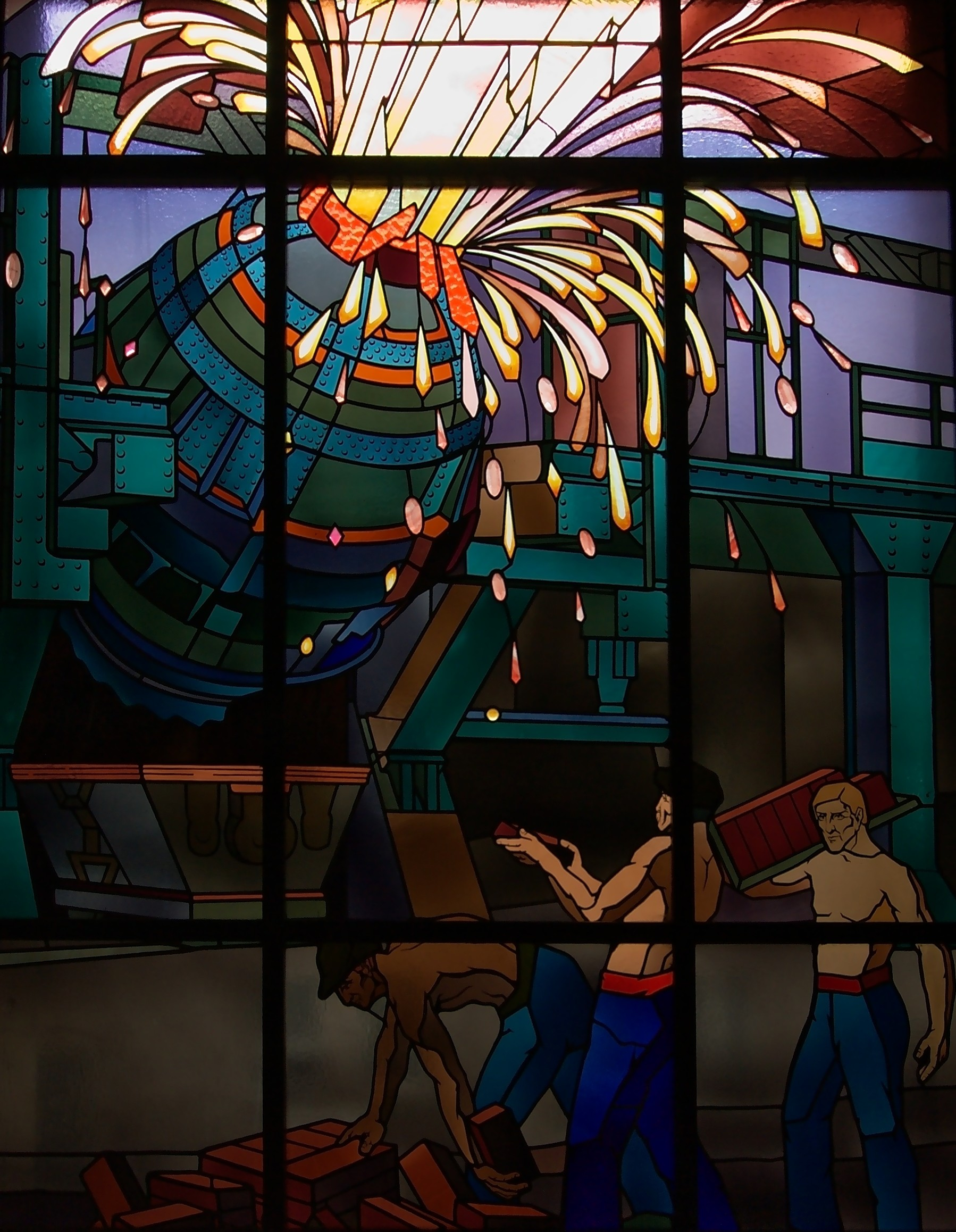

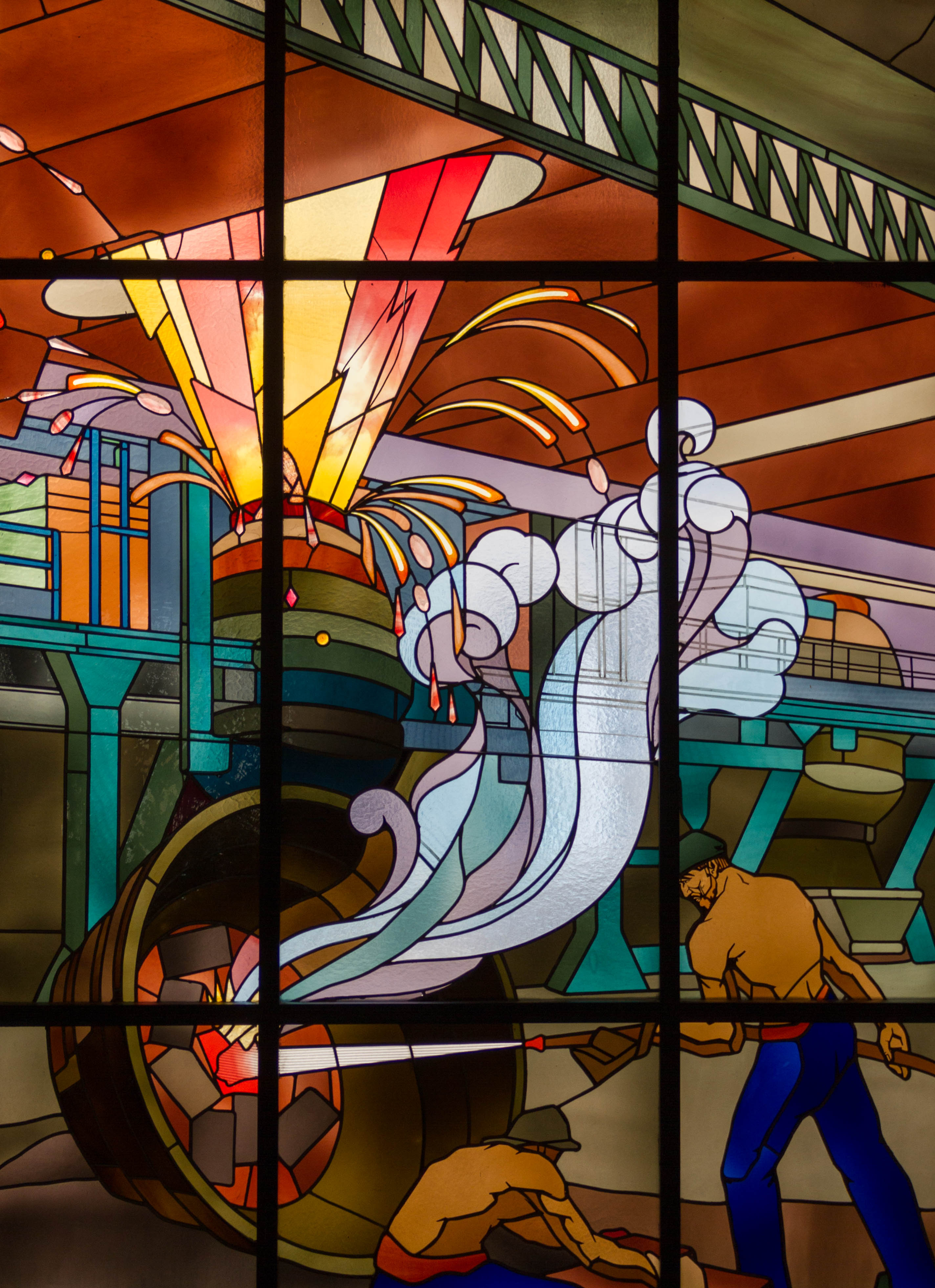

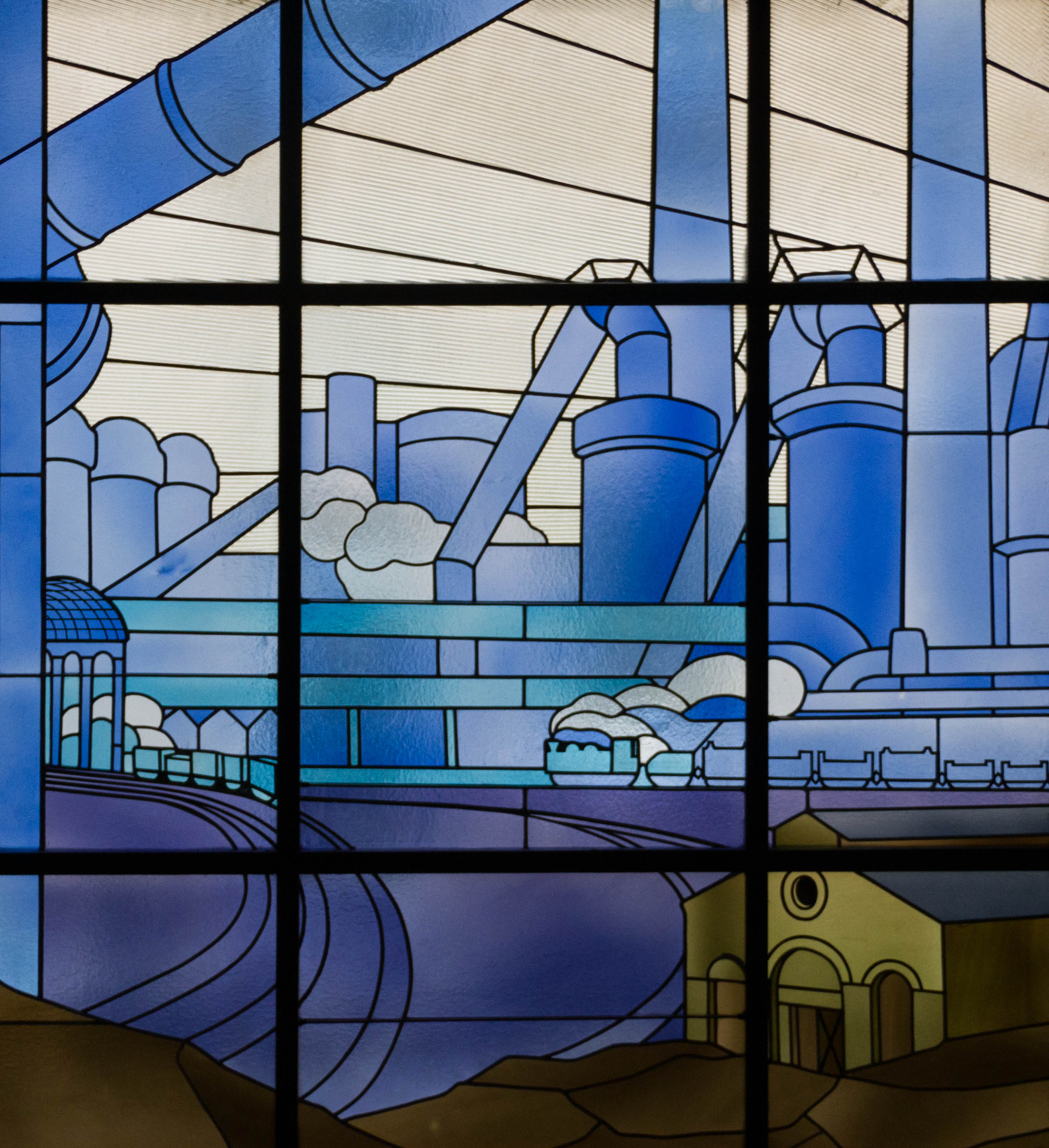

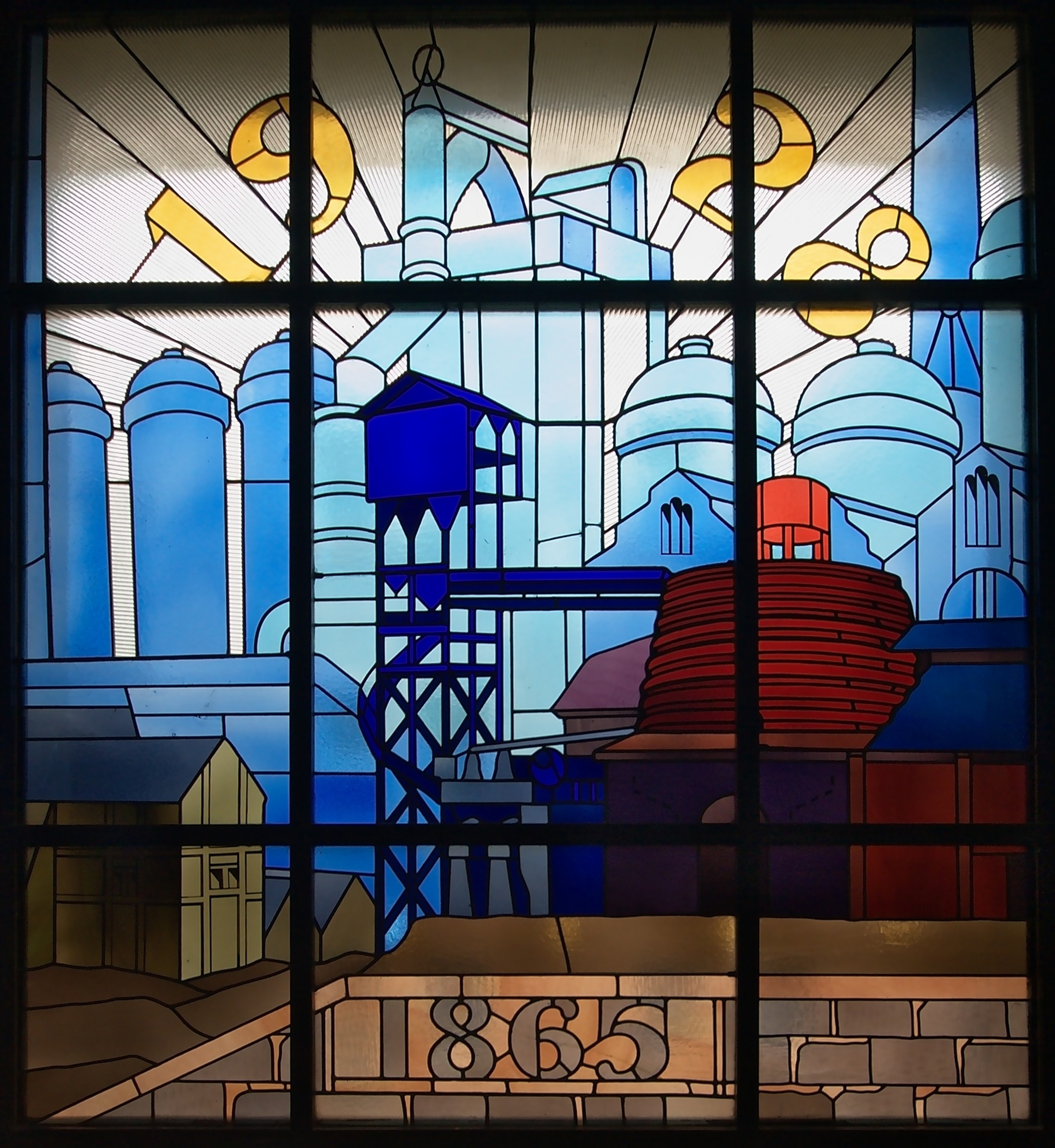

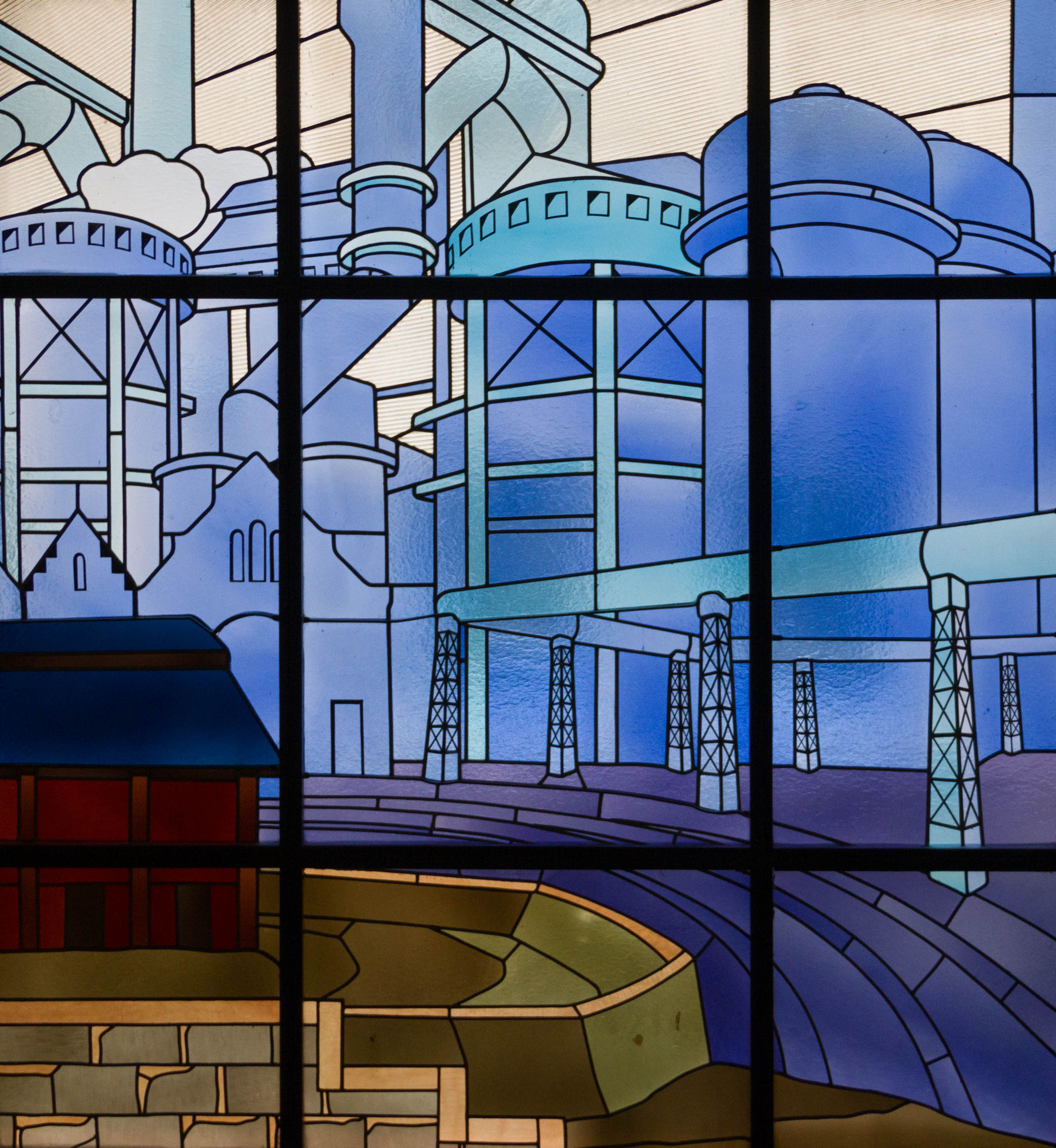

== See also ==
- Jacques Majorelle
- Hôtel Terminus
