= René Guilleré =

French lawyer (1878–1931)

- Born: 16 August 1878; Valenciennes, France
- Died: 24 November 1931 (aged 53); Brussels, Belgium
- Occupation: Lawyer
- Known for: Atelier Primavera

René Guilleré (16 August 1878 – 24 November 1931) was a French lawyer who founded the Ateliers Primavera, which made decorative art objects.

== Life ==
René Guilleré was born in 1878. He became a lawyer. He was a lover of art and music, a collector of African art, a poet and dramatic author. He joined the movement L'Art dans Tout, which encouraged artists interested in decorative arts. Guilleré had a passion for authentic artisan objects. He was one of the founders of the Société des artistes décorateurs (SAD) in 1901 "to react against commercialism, shameful copying, bad taste and the inertia of trade and industry." He helped organize the first SAD exhibition in 1904. He also contributed to various reviews.

In March 1906, in Paris, Guilleré married Charlotte Chauchet (1878–1964), a young painter. They had a house built in brick and slate, with an unpretentious but elegant facade, at 13 rue Eugénie Gérard in Vincennes. Guilleré was president of the Société des artistes décorateurs in 1911. He arranged for foundation of the Atelier Primavera, which made decorative art for sale by the Printemps department stores. He was one of the moving forces behind the 1925 Exposition internationale des arts décoratifs et industriels modernes.

René Guilleré died in 1931, aged 53. One of his books of poetry, Funiculaire, was published posthumously with a preface by his friend Léon-Paul Fargue.

== Primavera ==
Around 1910 Guilleré met Peter Laguionie, one of the managers of the Printemps department stores, who agreed to promote the work of decorative artists in his stores. Laguionie had already arranged competitions for decorative art and had offered some modern furniture, but the energetic Guilleré persuaded him to go further and support production. The Atelier Primavera (Note: Primavera means "Spring" in Latin, a reference to the Printemps store, since Printemps means "Spring" in French.) was founded in 1912, with Guilleré's wife as its head. Guilleré codirected the workshop. In its first year it created and distributed more than 800 models, but production was halted with the outbreak of war in 1914.

The atelier reopened after the war. Guilleré and his wife recruited talented young people, mostly under thirty years old and believers in the new aesthetics. They purchased the Faïencerie de Ste-Radegonde and commissioned innovative ceramicists. Primavera created furniture, fabrics, wallpaper, lights, carpets, mirrors, vases and statuettes. Modern and affordable products were made for the mass market. Primavera also made complete sets of furniture and decoration for wealthy private or public clients, including hotels, casinos and embassies. They also submitted work to exhibitions such as the Salon des Artistes décorateurs, Salon d'Automne, Salon des Artistes français and Salon de la Décoration contemporaine. Other department stores followed the lead of Printemps, with La Maïtrise at Galeries Lafayette in 1921 under Maurice Dufrêne, Pomone at Le Bon Marché in 1923 under Paul Follot and Studium Louvre at Magasins du Louvre in 1924.

== 1925 Exposition internationale des arts décoratifs ==
Guilleré published a proposal on 1 June 1911 for an Exposition internationale des arts décoratifs. The proposal was sponsored by the leading arts associations and by more the fifty members of the decorative arts establishment. It was supported by all parties in the Chamber of Deputies in a vote in July 1912. The exposition was planned for 1915, but plans were interrupted by World War I (1914–18). It would eventually take place in 1925. It would focus on decorative art, where modern industry and modern design came together.

Guilleré imagined elegant designs for mass-produced objects such as drain covers and automobile radiator caps. He also wanted France to assert her leadership in modern design over Germany, Britain and Italy. He was reacting to the success that the German decorators had achieved at the 1910 Salon d'Automne, which he saw as a threat to France's traditional domination of style. In the 1922 prospectus for the Exposition internationale des arts décoratifs et industriels modernes Guilleré proposed, not for the first time, that the artist, the industrialist and the artisan should collaborate.

A lavish display by Primavera was arranged for the 1925 Exposition. The Primavera pavilion was designed by the architects Henri Sauvage and Georges Wybo. It had a post-and-beam construction supporting a reinforced concrete dome 20 metres (66 ft) in diameter. The dome was studded with large lenses of colored glass made by René Lalique, which looked like "boulders that are still wet from the sea". Charlotte Chauchet-Guilleré undertook the interior design, with advice from her husband and from Jacques-Emile Ruhlmann. The pavilion was one of four, with the products of the other studios placed at the other corners of the exposition, where they were the main attractions of the event. The temple-like building was criticized as being overblown, but the interior presented an elegant and refined decor.

== Publications ==
Publications include:

- Guilleré, René (1924). Lettre à l'amateur de céramique par le directeur de l'atelier Primavera au Printemps, Paris. Paris: Printemps. p. 41.
- Guilleré, René; Fargue, Léon-Paul (1933). Funiculaire. Préface de Léon-Paul Fargue. impr. R. Bussière. p. 191.

== Sources ==
- "1925 Art Deco Architecture - Pavillon Primavera". Pixelcreation (in French). Archived from the original on 2018-03-10.
- Banham, Joanna (2015-04-24). Encyclopedia of Interior Design. Routledge. ISBN 978-1-136-78758-4.
- Candau, Antoine (2013). "Naissance de la céramique moderne". Primavera, naissance de la céramique moderne (in French). Galerie Anne-Sophie Duval.
- Cottington, David (1998). Cubism in the Shadow of War: The Avant-garde and Politics in Paris 1905-1914. Yale University Press. ISBN 978-0-300-07529-8.
- Fravalo, Fabienne (2015). "Primavera, l'atelier d'art des magasins du Printemps". L’Histoire par l’image (in French).
- Green, Christopher (2003). Art in France, 1900-1940. Yale University Press. ISBN 978-0-300-09908-9.
- Hardy, Alain-René (2015). "L'atelier Primavera: Atelier d'art des grands magazins du Printemps" (in French). Société des Amis de la Bibliothèque Forney.
- Hirsch, Charles-Henry (1 September 1933). "Les revues". Mercure de France (in French) (845).
- Imbert, Dorothée (1993-01-01). The Modernist Garden in France: Dorothée Imbert. Yale University Press. ISBN 978-0-300-04716-5.
- Lajoix, Anne (April 2010). "Colette Guéden (1905-2000), Primavera et la céramique" (PDF). Les Dossiers de la faïence fine (in French) (27).
- "L'atelier d'art des magasins du Printemps". l'art nouveau.
- Thiébaut, Philippe (1992). Guimard (in French). Réunion des Musées Nationaux. p. 451.
- Vincennes (94), un patrimoine à découvrir
