= Georges Wybo =

French architect

Eugène Adolphe Henri Georges Wybo
- Born: 11 October 1880; Paris, France
- Died: 18 January 1943 (aged 62); Paris, France
- Occupation: Architect

Eugène Adolphe Henri Georges Wybo (11 October 1880 – 18 January 1943) was a French architect who is known for the casino and the Hôtel Royal in Deauville, and for the department stores that he built for the Printemps chain.

== Life ==
Georges Wybo was born in Paris in 1880, the son of a jeweler. He was admitted to the École des Beaux-Arts in 1899, where he studied under Victor Laloux. He won the Chaudesaigues prize in 1901, but does not appear to have graduated. He exhibited regularly at the annual salons of the Société Nationale des Beaux-Arts from 1900 to 1910. During this period he made theater sets, designed the monument built in Ris-Orangis in memory of the singers who were lost with the sinking of the liner Général-Chanzy, and designed the tomb of the cartoonist Caran d'Ache in Clairefontaine-en-Yvelines. Wybo also designed various houses in the country.

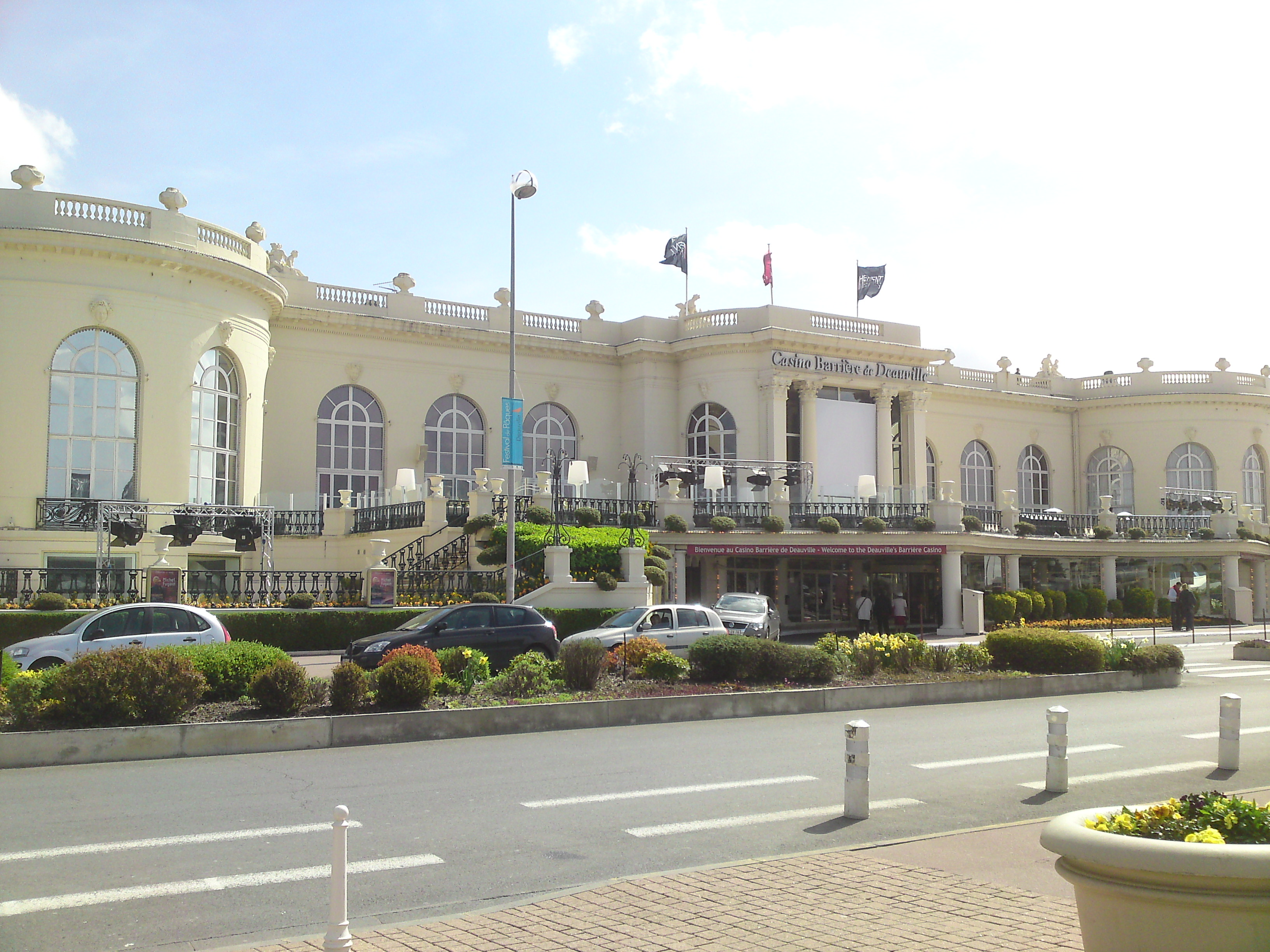
Casino in Deauville

Wybo's first major commission was for the casino in Deauville (1911–12), which drew inspiration from the Grand Trianon. The work combined ostentatious luxury with functionality, and led to further commissions in Deauville. In 1913 Wybo and Théo Petit designed the Hôtel Royal in Deauville. In 1912 he replaced René Binet as chief architect of the Printemps department store. He designed forty stores for Printemps including reconstruction of the building on the Boulevard Haussmann in the 9th arrondissement of Paris after a fire in 1921.

Between 1917 and 1922 Wybo constructed the buildings of Grands-Moulins. The largest is on the bank of the Seine. They were later renovated by Rudy Ricciotti, and the largest is now entirely occupied by a library. In 1919 the Commission on Reconstruction gave him responsibility for urban planning in several towns in the Ardennes. In the 1920s Wybo worked for the car manufacturer André Citroën for whom he developed stylish showrooms and garages.

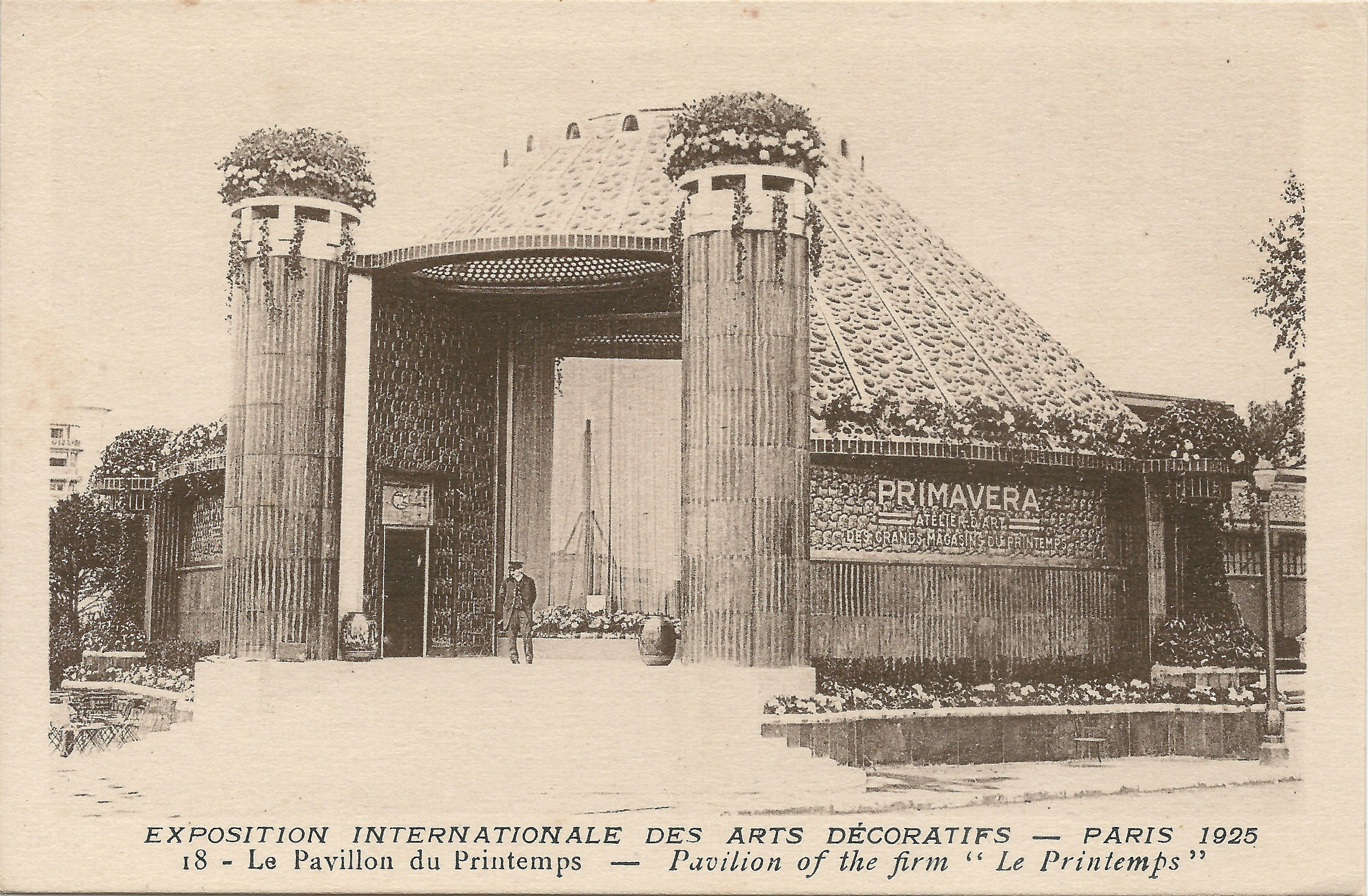
The Primavera pavilion at the Exposition Internationale des Arts Décoratifs (1925)

A lavish display by Primavera was arranged for the Exposition Internationale des Arts Décoratifs in Paris in 1925. The Primavera pavilion was designed by the architects Henri Sauvage and Georges Wybo. It had a post-and-beam construction supporting a reinforced concrete dome 20 metres (66 ft) in diameter. The dome was studded with large lenses of colored glass made by René Lalique, which looked like "boulders that are still wet from the sea". Charlotte Chauchet and René Guilleré undertook the interior design, with advice from Jacques-Emile Ruhlmann. The pavilion was one of four, with the products of the other studios placed at the other corners of the exposition, where they were the main attractions of the event. The temple-like building was criticized as being overblown, but the interior presented an elegant and refined decor.

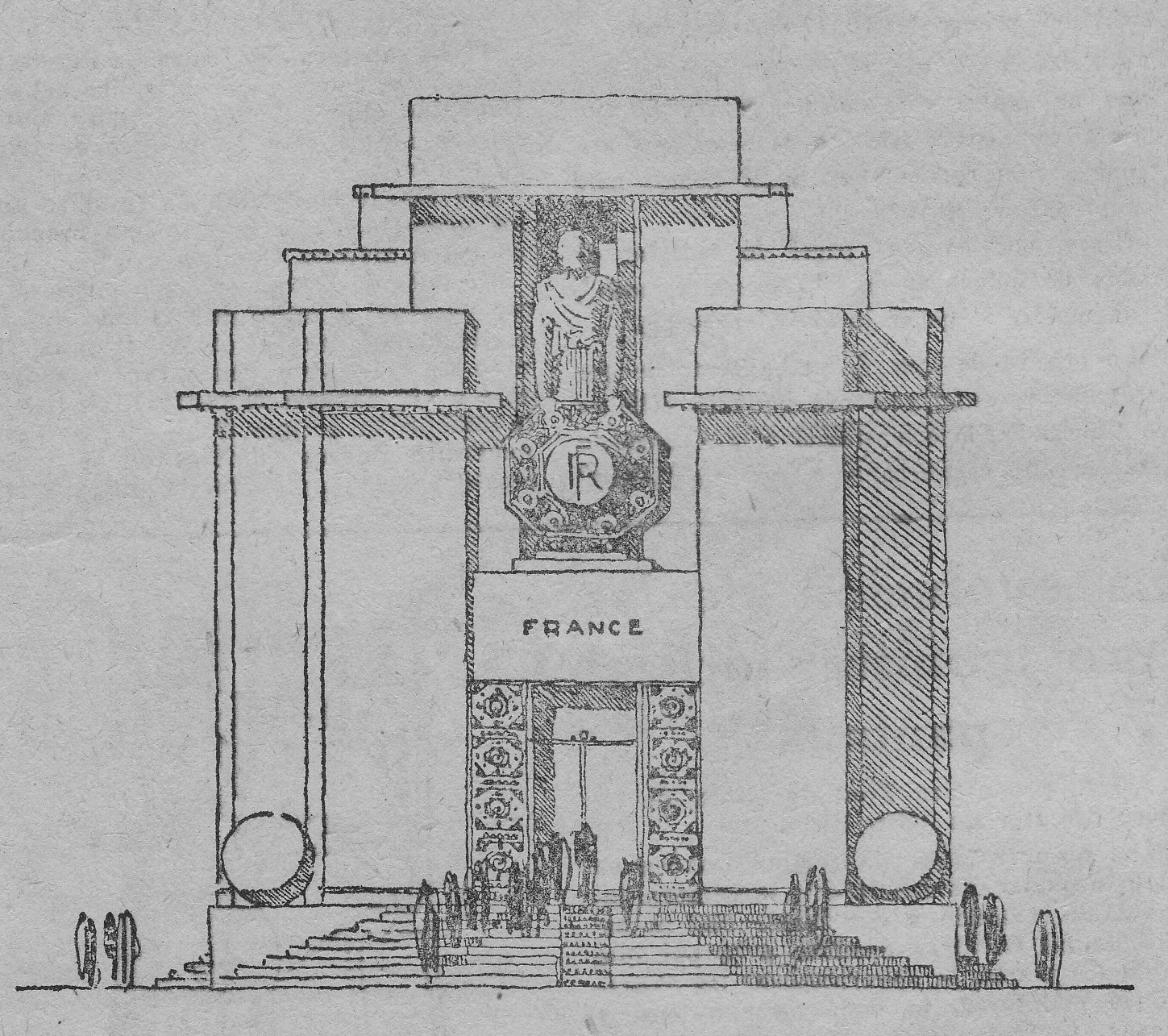
French pavilion at the 1929 Barcelona International Exposition

Wybo designed the Hotel George V near the Arc de Triomphe for the American hotelier Joel Hillman in 1928. The hotel has a huge marbled foyer, a large anteroom and a huge interior corridor, so it could accommodate a crowd of visitors with their luggage. In 1929 Wybo designed the Hôtel du Golf in Deauville. He designed the French pavilion at the 1929 Barcelona International Exposition, located in the Plaza de los Reyes in the angle formed by two naves of the Palace of Alfonso XIII. The structure was modern, sober and elegant. The building was in a classical style with Art Deco elements. It was a single-volume building in the shape of a cube, with its roof formed by superimposed stepped rectangular sections, like a ziggurat, with a sculpture at the front in the shape of a woman and the initials R. F. (République Française).

From 1931 Wybo was architect for the Prisunic stores, a subsidiary of Printemps. He built more than twelve stores for this chain in different parts of France. Georges Wybo died in Paris in 1943.

== Selected works ==
Apart from the many department stores, Wybo designed various other significant buildings including:

- 1911–12: New casino in Deauville
- 1917–21: Grands Moulins de Paris
- 1923: Hôtel Royal in Deauville
- 1925: Primavera pavilion, with Henri Sauvage
- 1928: Hotel George V near the Champs-Élysées
- 1929: Hôtel du Golf in Deauville
- 1931: Theatre des Ambassadeurs near the Champs-Élysées

== Publications ==
- Bonnefon, Jean de; Wybo, Georges (1912). Les maisons des champs au pays de France. Société d'éditions. p. 94.
- Georges Wybo (1918). Réflections et croquis sur l'architecture au pays de France. Hachette. p. 91.
- Jean Brunhes (1926). Gabriel Hanotaux (ed.). Histoire de la nation française. Vol. II, Géographie humaine de la France. Illustrations by Auguste Lepère, Georges Wybo, M. Méheut, etc. Paris: Société de l'histoire nationale : Plon-Nourrit, cop..

== Sources ==
- "1925 Art Deco Architecture - Pavillon Primavera". Pixelcreation (in French). Archived from the original on 2018-03-10.
- Bisbrouck, Marie-Françoise; Desjardins, Jérémie; Ménil, Céline; Poncé, Florence; Francois Rouyer-Gayette (2004-01-01). Libraries as Places: Buildings for the 21st century: Proceedings of the Thirteenth Seminar of IFLA's Library Buildings and Equipment Section together with IFLA's Public Libraries Section Paris, France, 28 July - 1 August 2003. Walter de Gruyter. ISBN 978-3-11-093562-2.
- "Exposición International de Barcelona 1929: France". worldfairs.info.
- "Fonds Wybo, Georges (1880-1943). 177 Ifa". Cité de l'architecture et du patrimoine. Ministère de la culture et de la communication. Archived from the original on 2016-03-03.
- Fravalo, Fabienne (2015). "Primavera, l'atelier d'art des magasins du Printemps". L’Histoire par l’image (in French).
- "Georges WYBO (1880-1943)" (in French). Université Paris Diderot.
- Hardy, Alain-René (2015). "L'atelier Primavera: Atelier d'art des grands magazins du Printemps" (in French). Société des Amis de la Bibliothèque Forney.
- Sardar, Zahid (2014-10-16). In & Out of Paris: Gardens of Secret Delights. Gibbs Smith. ISBN 978-1-4236-3271-9.
