= Émile Gallé =

French glass artist and designer (1846–1904)

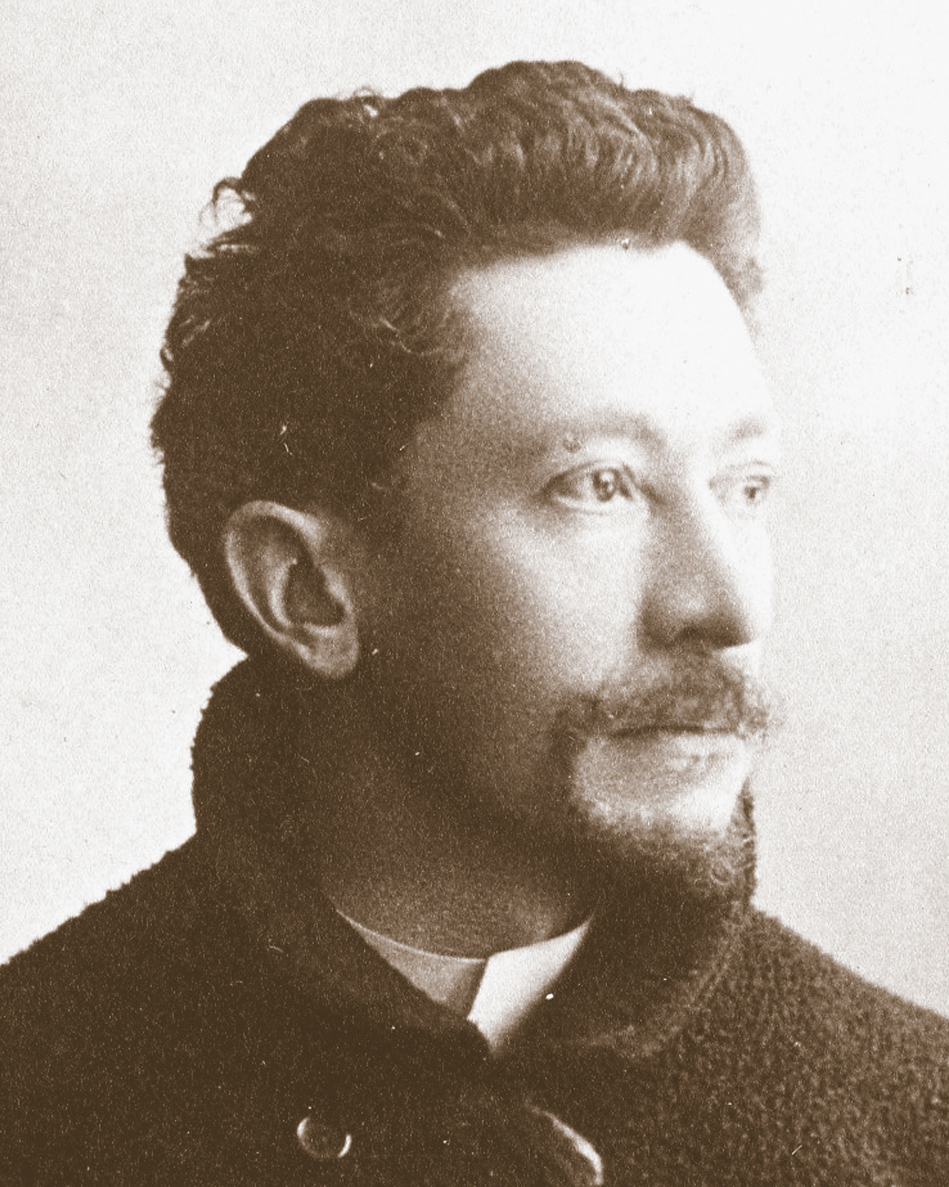
- Émile Gallé, (1889) Photo for entry card to 1889 Paris Exposition
- Born: 4 May 1846; Nancy, France
- Died: 23 September 1904 (aged 58); Nancy, France
- Occupation: Glass artist

Signature
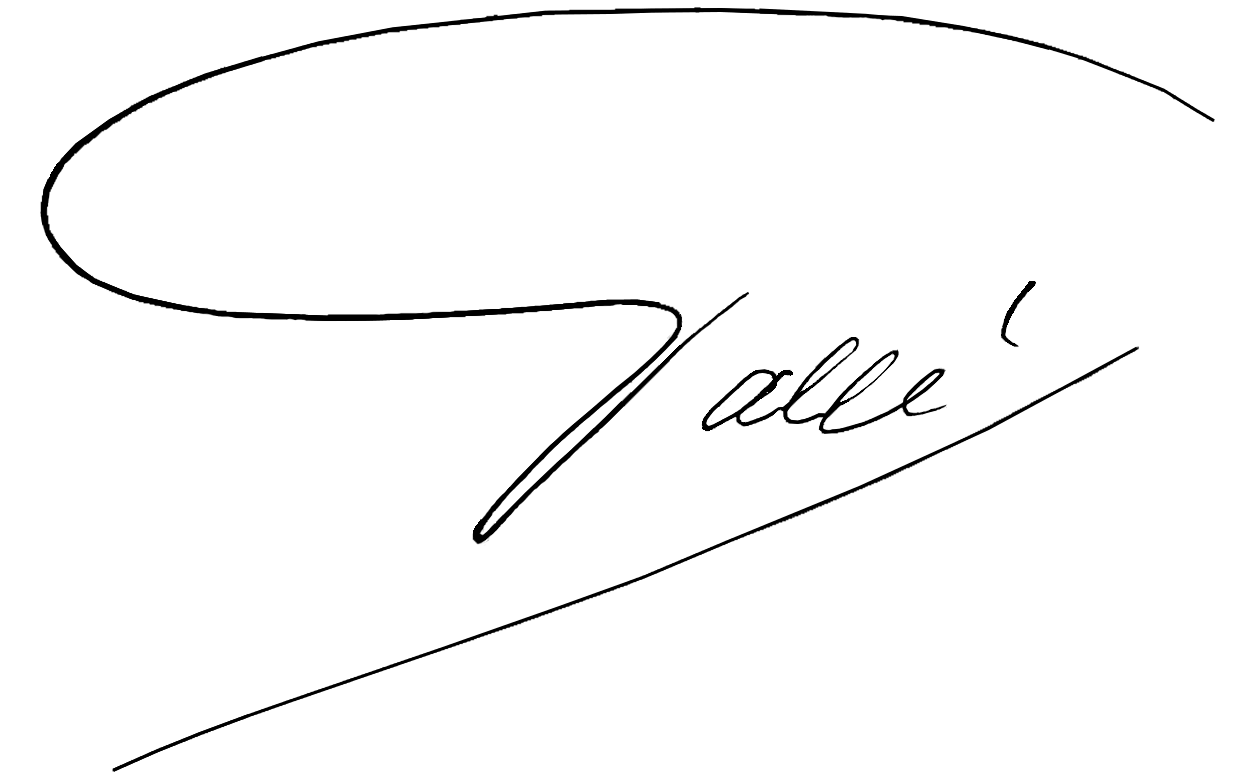
- Signature Émile Gallé (1846–1904) französischer Kunsthandwerker

Émile Gallé (French pronunciation: [emil ɡale]; 4 May 1846 in Nancy – 23 September 1904 in Nancy) was a French artist and designer who worked in glass, and is considered to be one of the major innovators in the French Art Nouveau movement. He was noted for his designs of Art Nouveau glass art and Art Nouveau furniture, and was a founder of the École de Nancy or Nancy School, a movement of design in the city of Nancy, France.

== Biography ==
=== Early life and education ===
Gallé born on 4 May 1846 in the city of Nancy, France. His father, Charles Gallé, was a merchant of glassware and ceramics who had settled in Nancy in 1844, and his father-in-law owned a factory in Nancy which manufactured mirrors. His father took over the direction of his mother's family business, and began to manufacture glassware with a floral design. He also took over a struggling faience factory and began manufacturing new products.

The young Gallé studied philosophy and natural science at the Lycée Imperial in Nancy. At the age of sixteen he went to work for the family business as an assistant to his father, making floral designs and emblems for both faience and glass. In his spare time he became an accomplished botanist, studying with D.A. Godron, the director of the Botanical Gardens of Nancy and author of the leading textbooks on French flora. He collected plants from the region and from as far away as Italy and Switzerland. He also took courses in painting and drawing, and made numerous drawings of plants, flowers, animals and insects, which became subjects of decoration.

At the age of sixteen he finished the Lycée in Nancy and went to Weimar in Germany from 1862–1866 to continue his studies in philosophy, botany, sculpture and drawing. In 1866, to prepare himself to inherit the family business, he went to work as an apprentice at the glass factory of Burgun and Schwerer in Meisenthal, and made a serious study of the chemistry of glass production. Some of his early glass and faience works for the family factory at Saint-Clémont were displayed at the 1867 Paris Universal Exposition. In early 1870 he designed a complete set of dishware with a rustic animal designs for the family enterprise. During this time he became acquainted with the painter, sculptor and engraver Victor Prouvé, an artist of the romantic "troubadour" style, who became his future collaborator in the Nancy School.

He enlisted for military service in the Franco-Prussian War in 1870, then was demobilised after the disastrous French defeat in 1871 and the French loss to Germany of much of the province of Lorraine, including Meisenthal where he had done his apprenticeship. Thereafter the Cross of Lorraine, the patriotic symbol of the region, became part of his signature on many of his works of art.

After his demobilization Gallé went to London, where he represented his father at an exhibition of the arts of France, then to Paris, where he remained for several months, visiting the Louvre and Cluny Museum, studying examples of ancient Egyptian art, Roman glassware and ceramics, and especially early Islamic enamelled glass, a technique which influenced his own later work. After further travel to Switzerland and Italy, he returned to Nancy and established his own workshop at the glass factory. His father Charles continued as head of the company, but Émile gradually took charge of the design and production. In 1873 he took up residence in La Garenne ("the rabbit warren"), the three-story neoclassical house built by his father and surrounded by gardens.

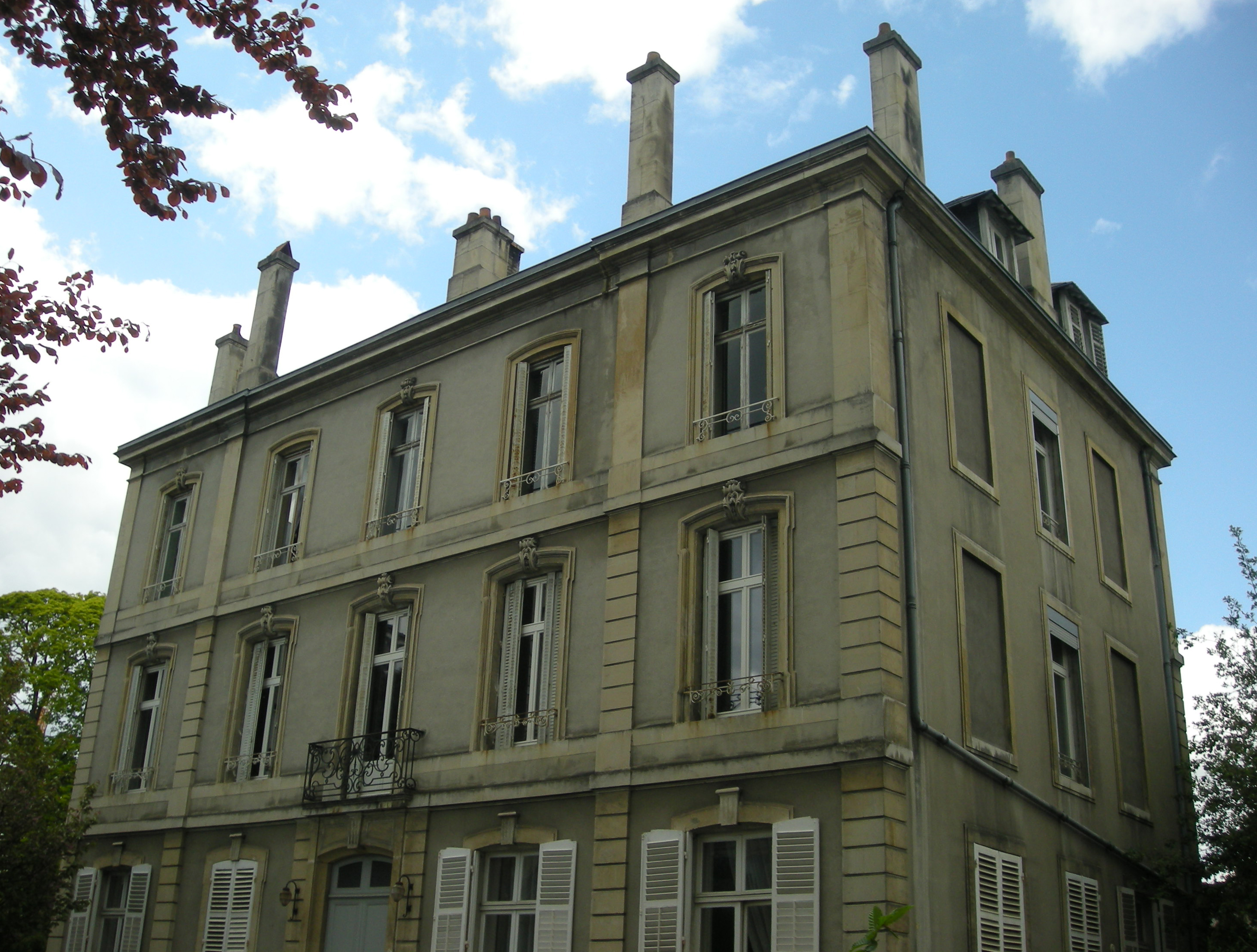
la Garenne, Gallé's house in Nancy

=== Head of the company and international success ===
In 1877 the elder Gallé turned the family business, the Maison Gallé-Reinemer, over to Émile. The following year Émile married Henriette Grimm, and after years of traveling, settled permanently in Nancy. He regrouped and reorganized the divisions of faience and glass manufacture, and in 1883 built new and larger workshops for glass and faience manufacture also for making furniture. By 1889 he had over three hundred employees. His own office and studio was in the center of the complex. He trained the designers himself, and sent them water colors of floral designs he made in the gardens of his residence. Gallé ordered his designers to use only real flowers and plants as their models, though they could take some liberties in the final design. He wrote in 1889, "it is necessary to have a pronounced bias in favour of models taken from flora and fauna, while giving them free expression."

Gallé continued to expand his activities. In 1885 he opened his first shop in Paris at 12 rue Richter, followed by other shops in Frankfurt-am-Maine and London. He also took part on a grand scale in international expositions; beginning with the 1878 Paris Universal Exposition, where his pavilion was thirty meters long; the 1893 World's Columbian Exposition in Chicago; and especially the 1900 Paris Universal Exposition, which was the summit of his fame. His work at the Exposition was rewarded with two Grand Prizes, a gold medal, and the title of a commander in the Legion of Honor.

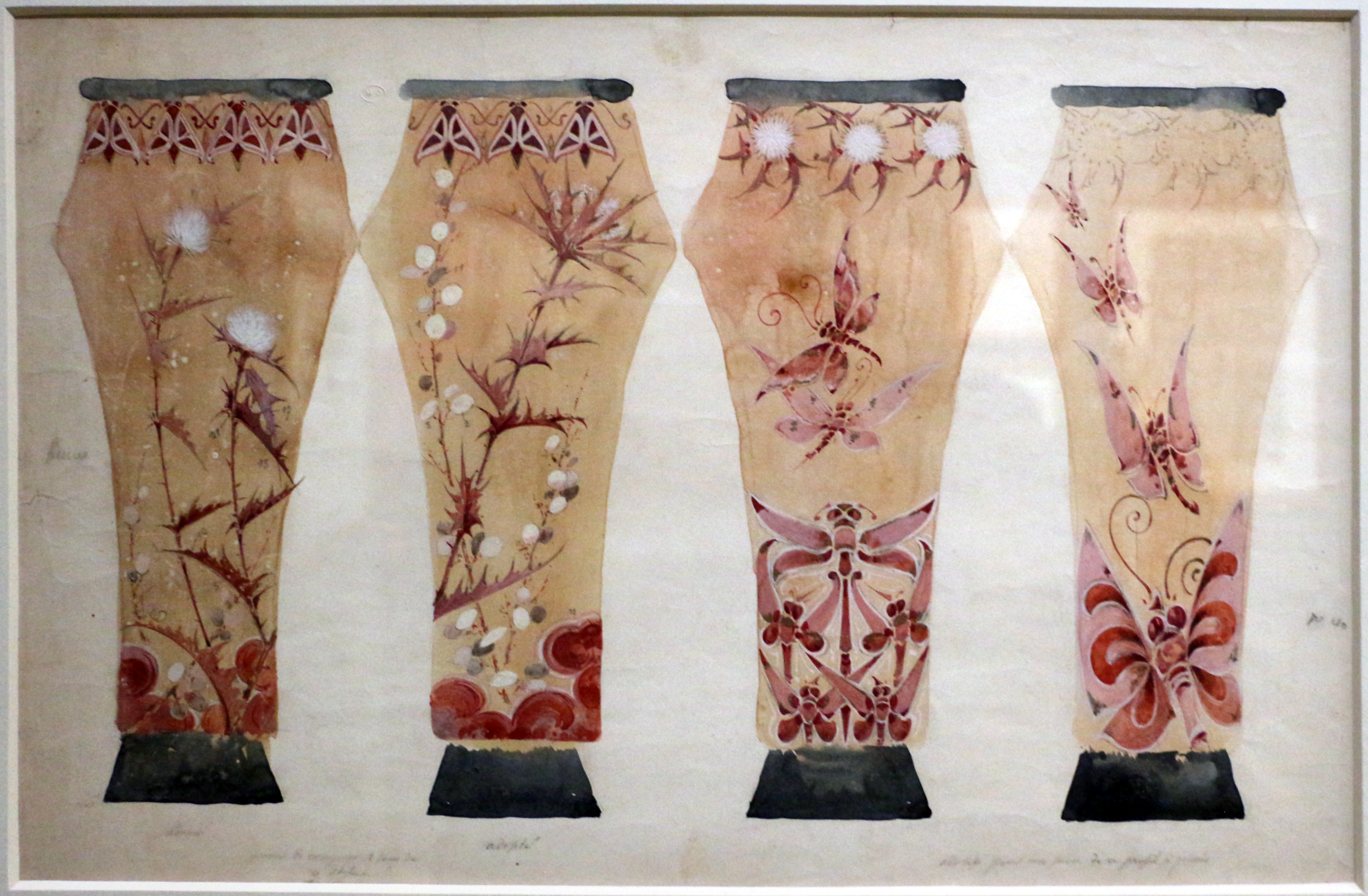
Designs of two vases by Gallé (1885)

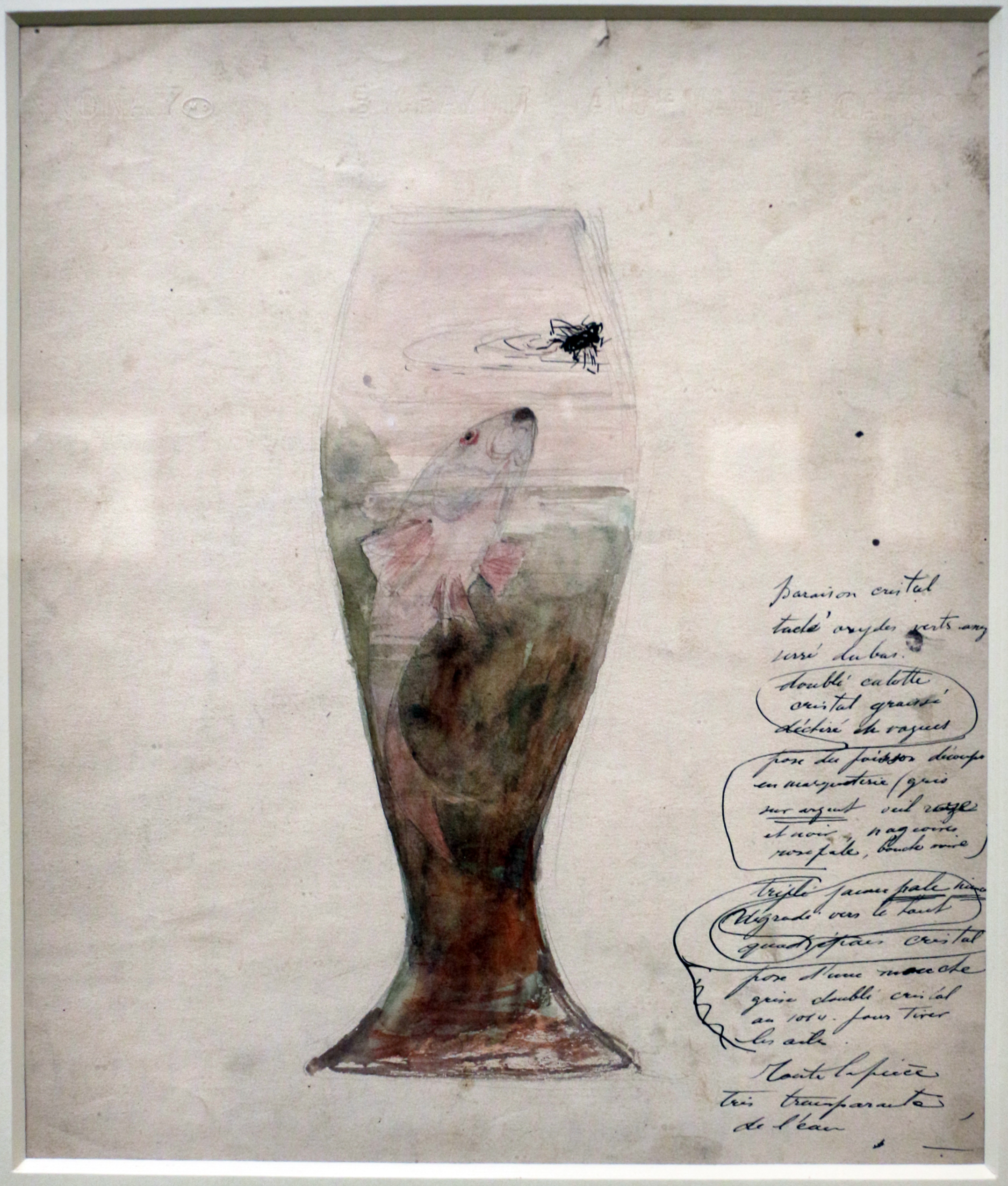
Design for a vase with a trout catching a fly (1895–1900)

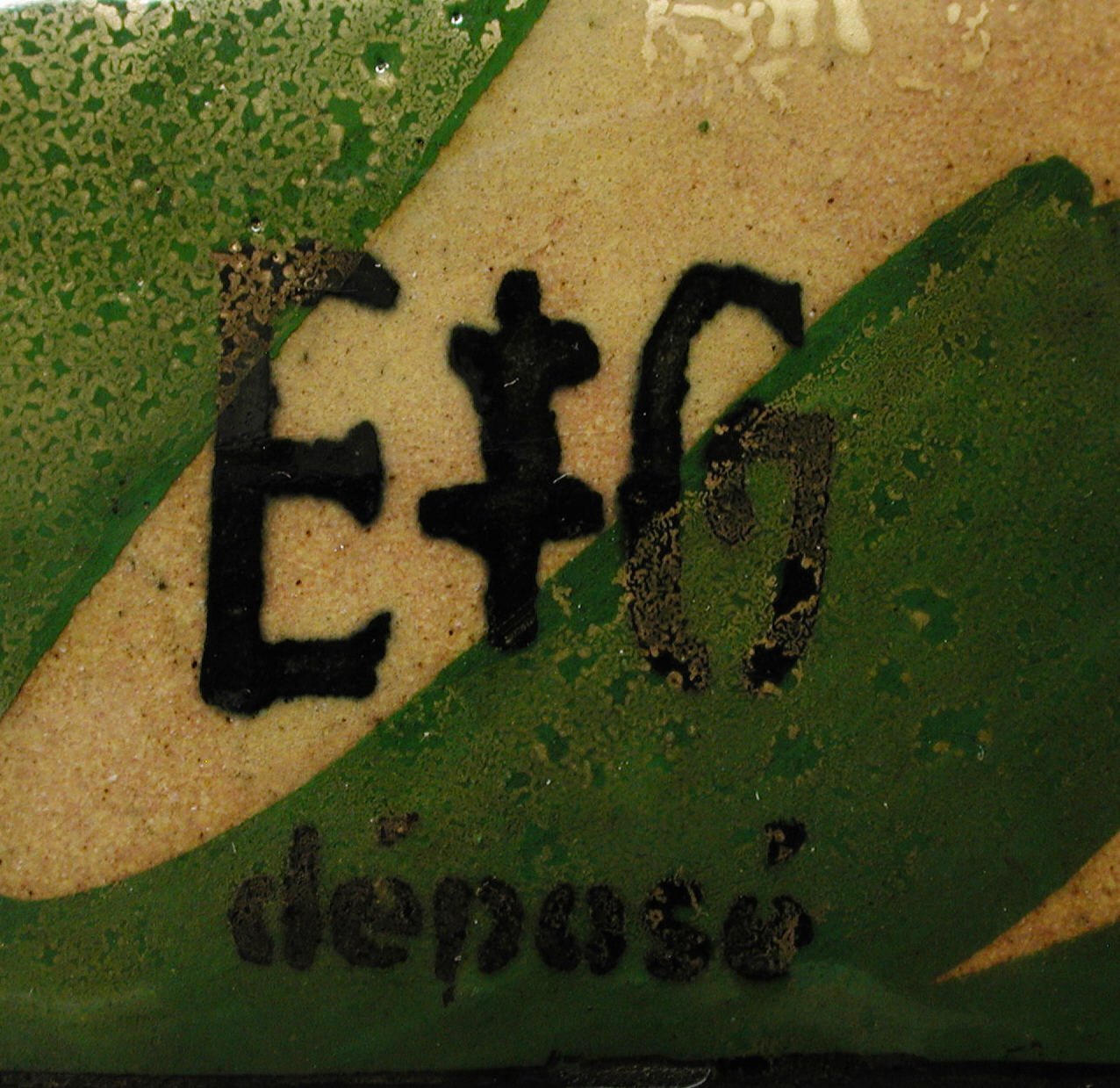
Mark of Gallé with the Cross of Lorraine emblem

=== Later years ===
In 1901, Gallé became the founder and first President of the École de Nancy, the organization of Nancy artists of the new style. Created to encourage the arts in Nancy, the glassmaker Antonin Daum, furniture maker Louis Majorelle and Eugene Vallin as Vice Presidents. He had many distinguished patrons, including the Edmond James de Rothschild, and his works were purchased by museums. In the highest form of tribute, his works were imitated by other glass and ceramics firms.

Much of his later work used symbolism, and expressed conflict. On one vase, called Fiori Oscuri, he engraved the words of Robert de Montesquiou: "I love the hour when everything changes its form, when light and dark struggle together."

He became involved in social causes. He was a founder, along with Victor Prouvé, of the Université populaire de Nancy, offering university-level classes to workers. He was treasurer of the Nancy branch of the Human Rights League of France and in 1898, at great risk for his business, one of the first to become actively involved in the defense of Alfred Dreyfus. He also publicly defended the Romanian Jews and spoke up in defense of the Irish Catholics in Britain, and supported William O’Brien, one of the leaders of the Irish revolt.

In 1904, his health worsened. He was diagnosed with leukemia, and died on 23 September 1904. His son-in-law, Professor Pedrizet of Nancy University, took over the direction of the firm, but the new management did not keep up with the new styles, and the firm went out of business in 1931. Only the carved wooden door survives of his original studio, now in the garden of the Musée de l'École de Nancy.

Gallé wrote a book on art entitled Écrits pour l'art 1884–89 ("Writings on Art 1884–89"), which was published posthumously in 1908.

== Glassware ==
=== Cased glass, cameo glass and enamel glass ===
Cased glass and cameo glass were two techniques often used by Gallé. Cased glass was made of two different layers of glass of different colors, fused together by heat. The first case of layer is made in a mold. When it is finished and cooled, a second layer is blown inside the first Then the piece is placed into the furnace, so the two layers fuse together. This could be repeated for multiple layers of glass. Cameo glass was a means of decorating cased glass. The cased glass of two or more colors was carved with a diamond saw or etched with acid, so that the colors of the layer underneath were visible and created a design. Enamel glass was decorated on the outside by a brush of enamels colored by metallic oxides.

=== Glass marquetry and patinated glass ===
Gallé continually experimented with new techniques of glass art. One of his major innovations was glass marquetry, or applying layers of glass on an object. He attached thin sheets of colored glass onto a hot glass object He could join the laminations or overlay them, adding an infinite number of layers and colors. This technique had been practiced by the Venetians during the Renaissance, but Gallé pushed it much further. While it allowed him almost limitless variations, it also presented great difficulties, since the glass had to be reheated for each new layer, and could easily crack.

Another difficulty was the appearance of defects and imperfections caused by contamination of the glass paste by dust or ashes or other materials, which caused what glassmakers called "bubbles", "grease" or stitches" inside the glass. Galleé decided to take advantage of the defects. He wrote in his patent application, "Concerned about such defects, I had the idea of using them as a decorative means, which permitted me, by inducing the effect in various ways, to obtain an entirely new type of decoration, called patina." Gallé proposed dusting the surface of the hot glass, which would give the appearance of fabric, or thick cobweb, or other textures. He proposed to make further decoration the surface with engraving, sand blasting, and wheel carving, and to embed fragments of hot glass into this patina or outer layer. The final result would then be covered with a thin layer of clear crystal, which could be left plain or also patinated.

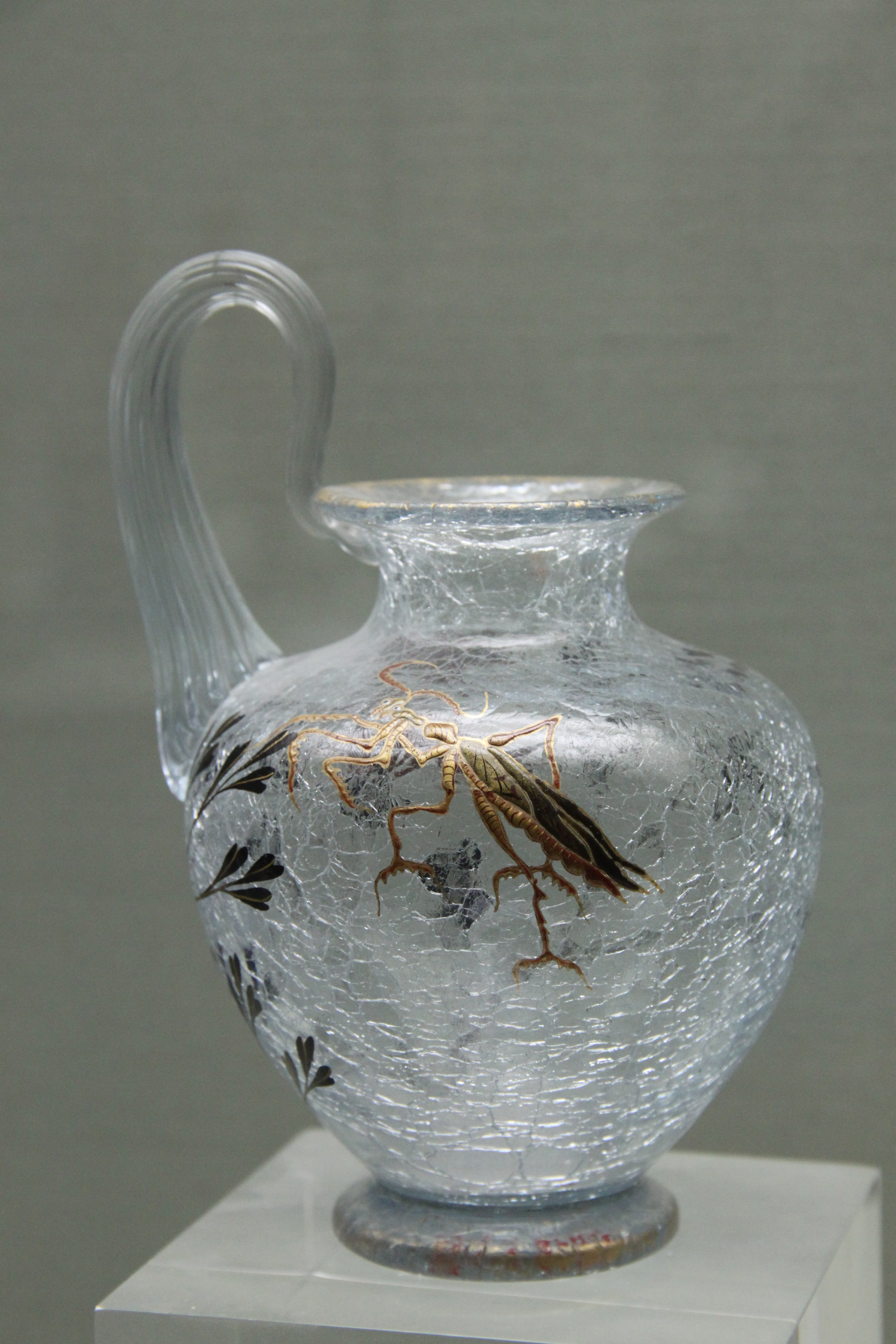
Crackled glass vase with praying mantis overlay (c. 1880)

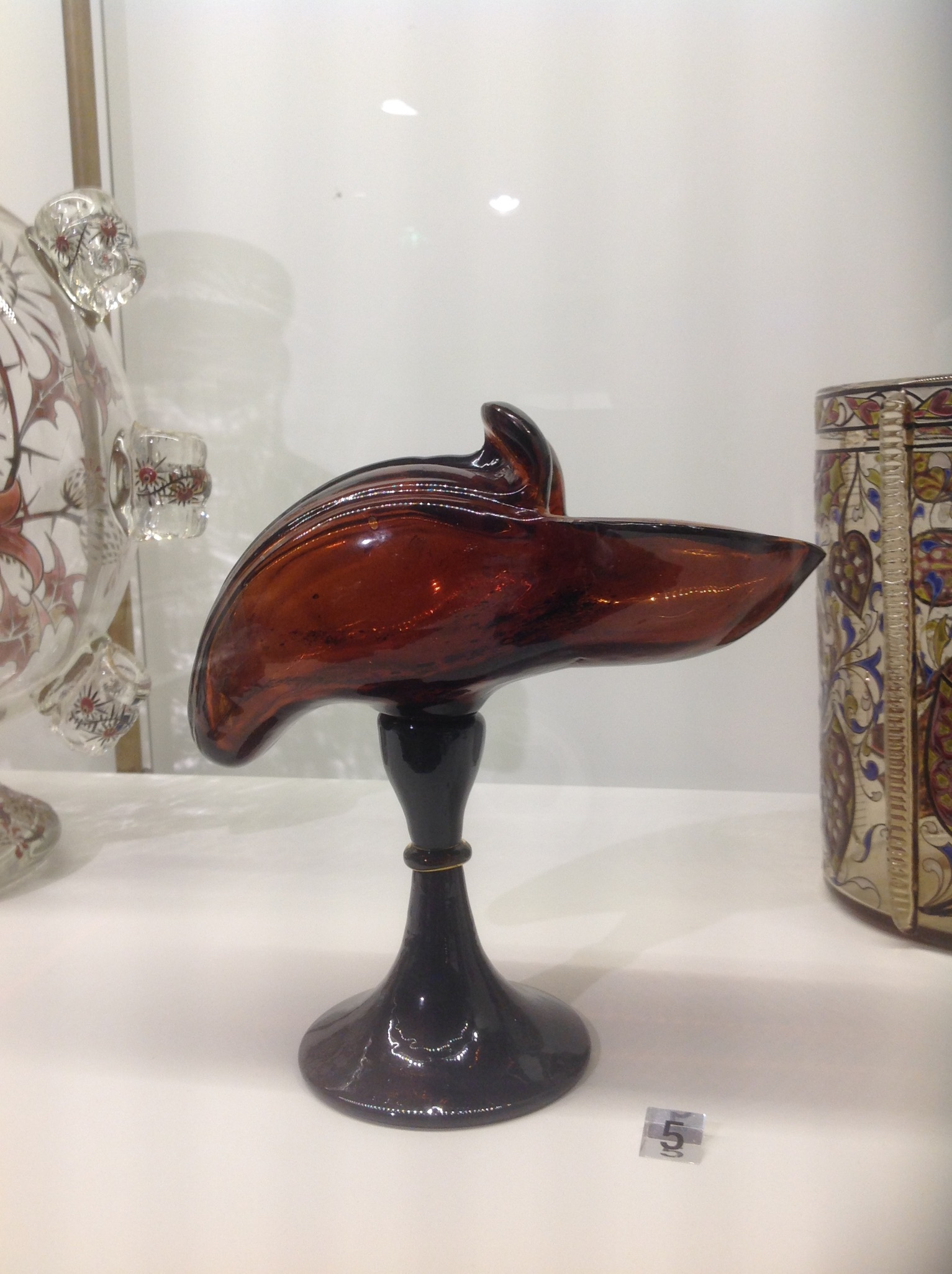
Glass cup in form of Lamiaceae flower, of blown and molded glass (1889)

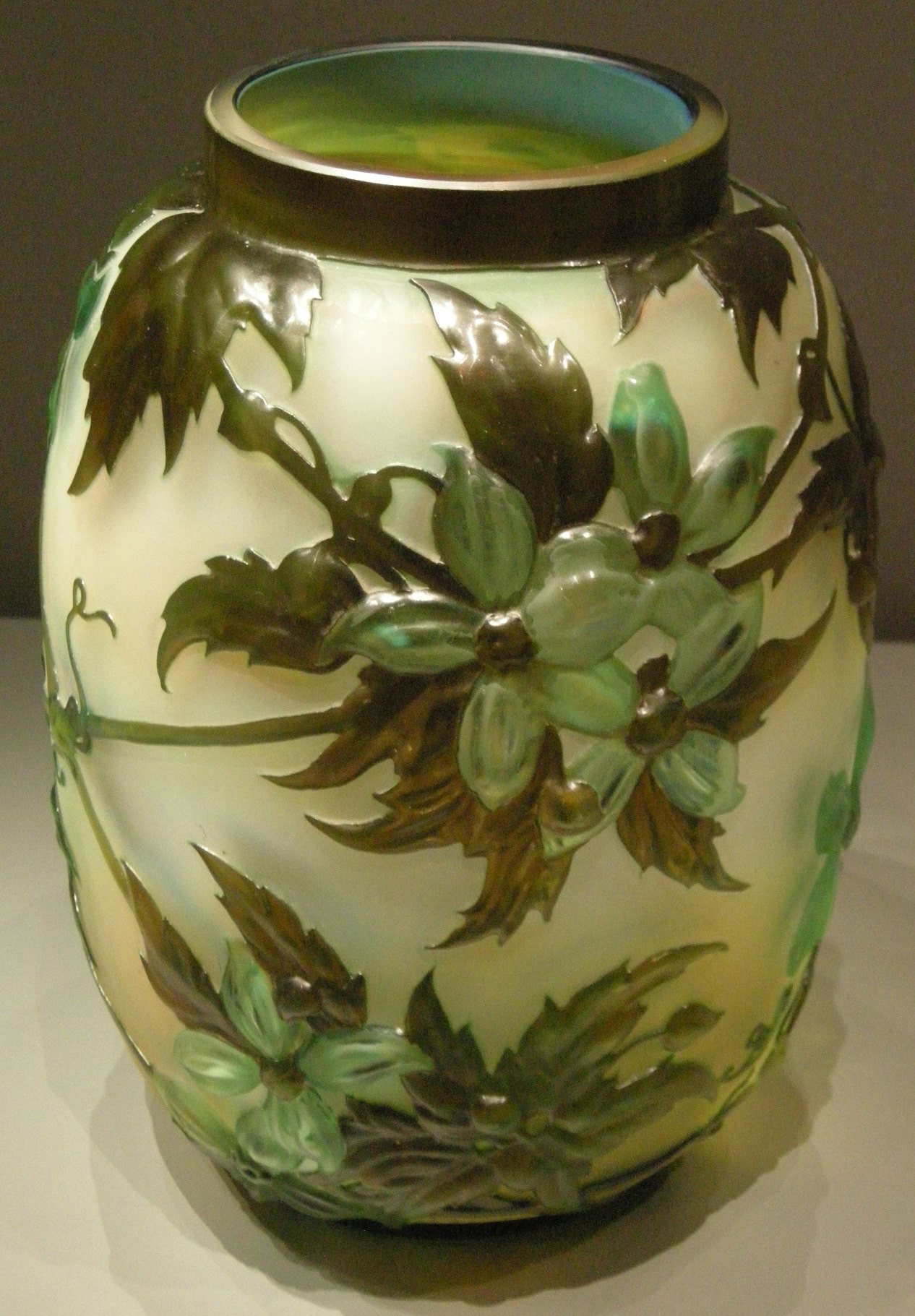
Marquetry glass vase with clematis flowers (1890–1900)

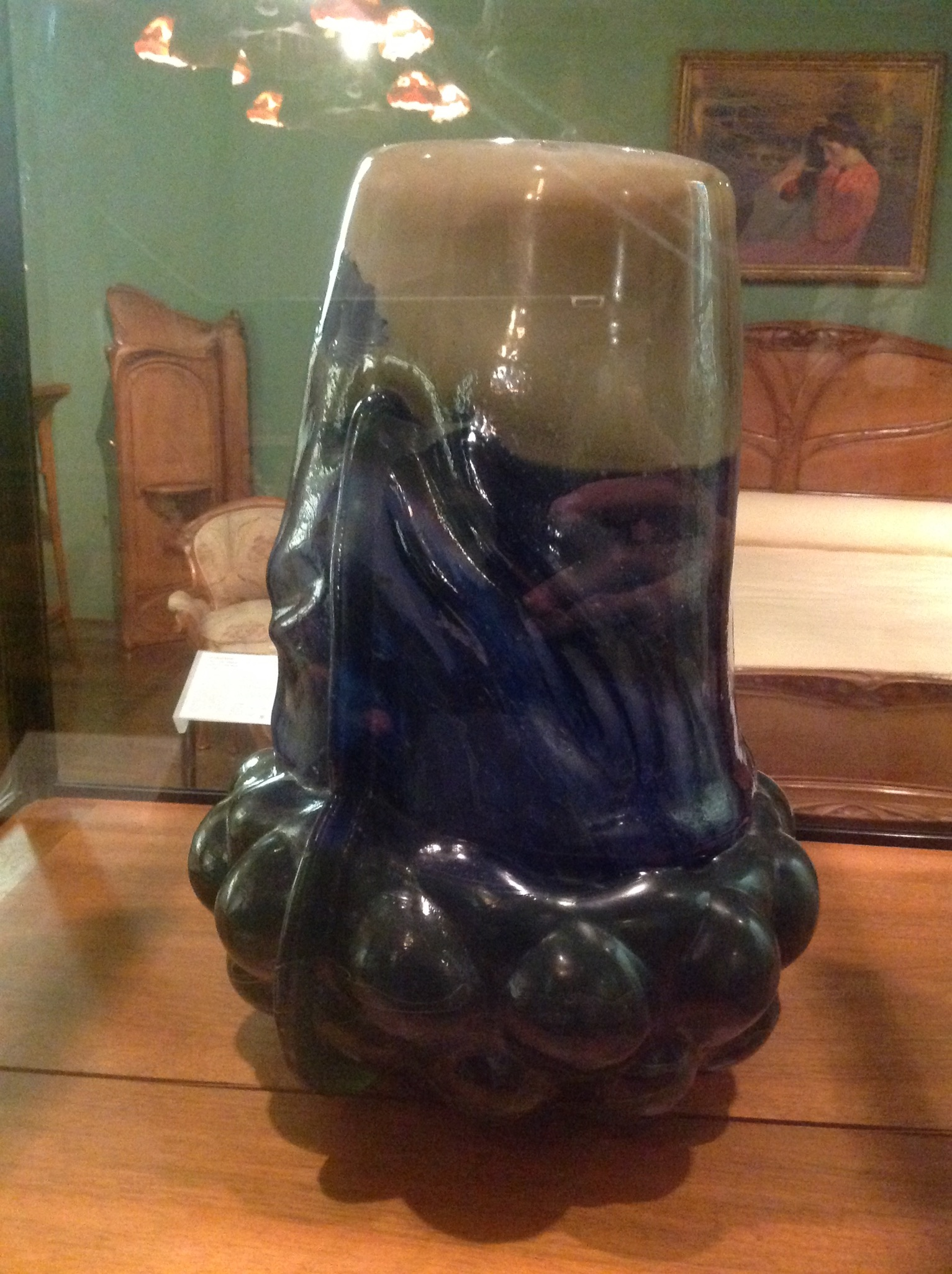
Chardon vase (1900), blown glass, modelled when hot, applied glass marquetry (Museum of Decorative Arts, Paris)

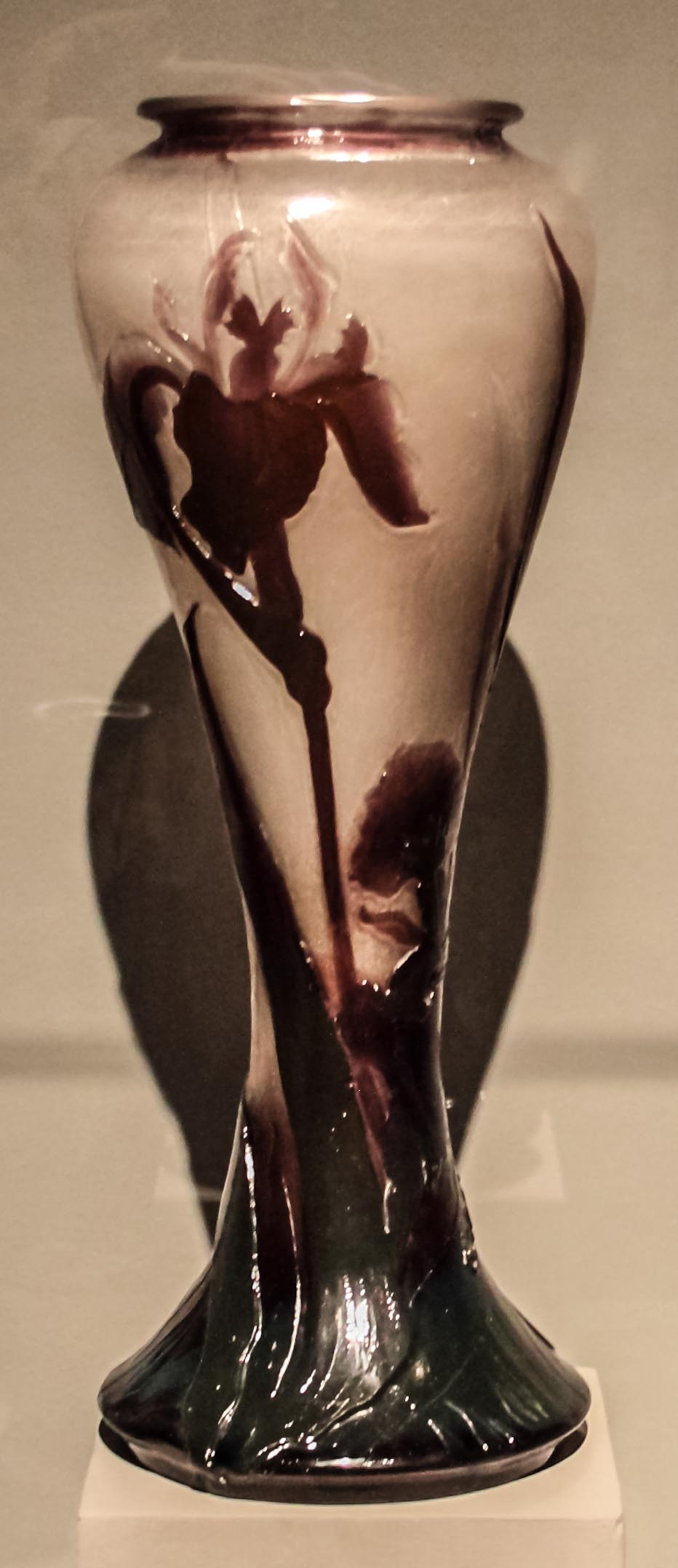
Vase with Iris flowers (c. 1900) (Budapest Museum of Fine Arts)

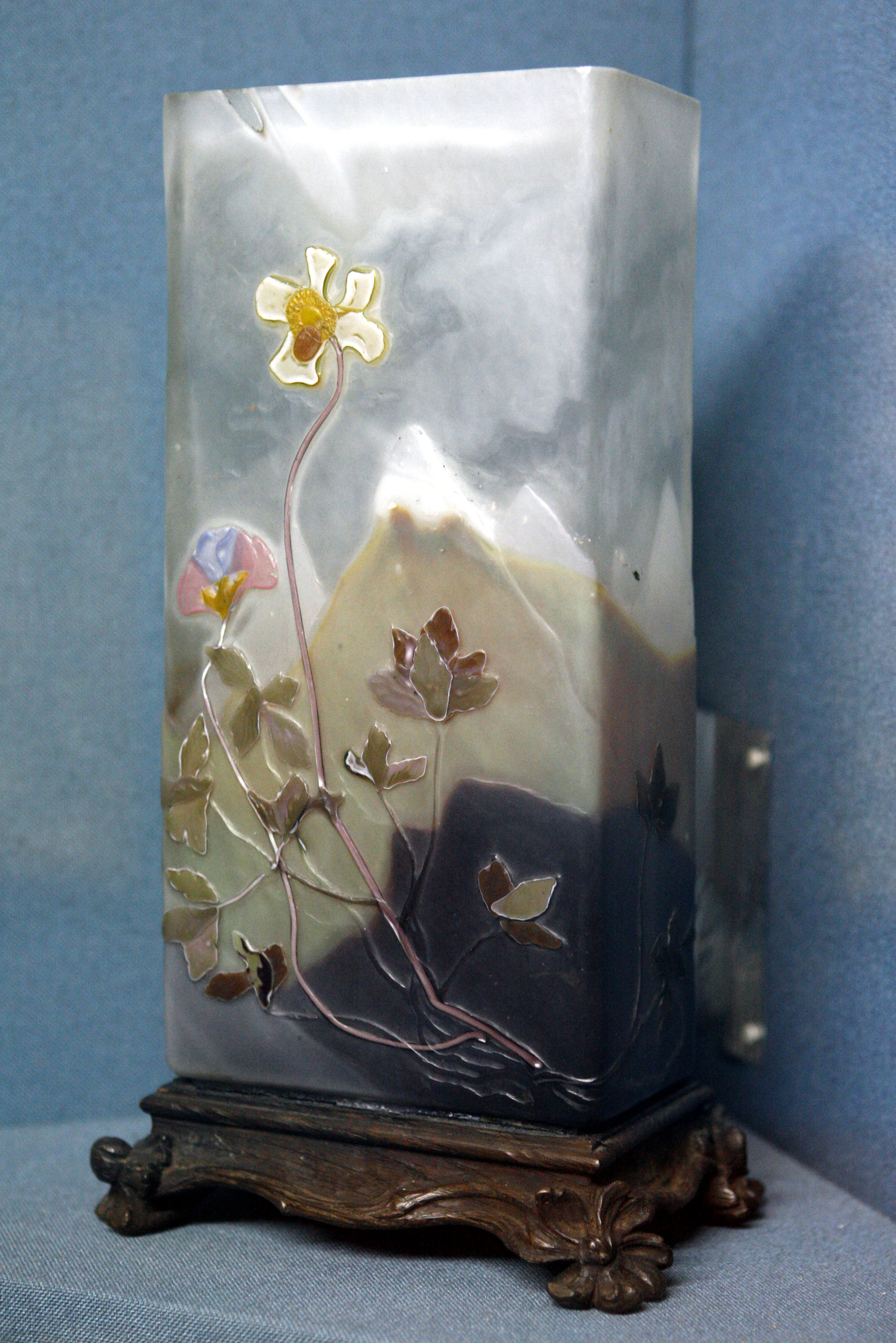
Engraved crystal vase by Gallé (c. 1900)

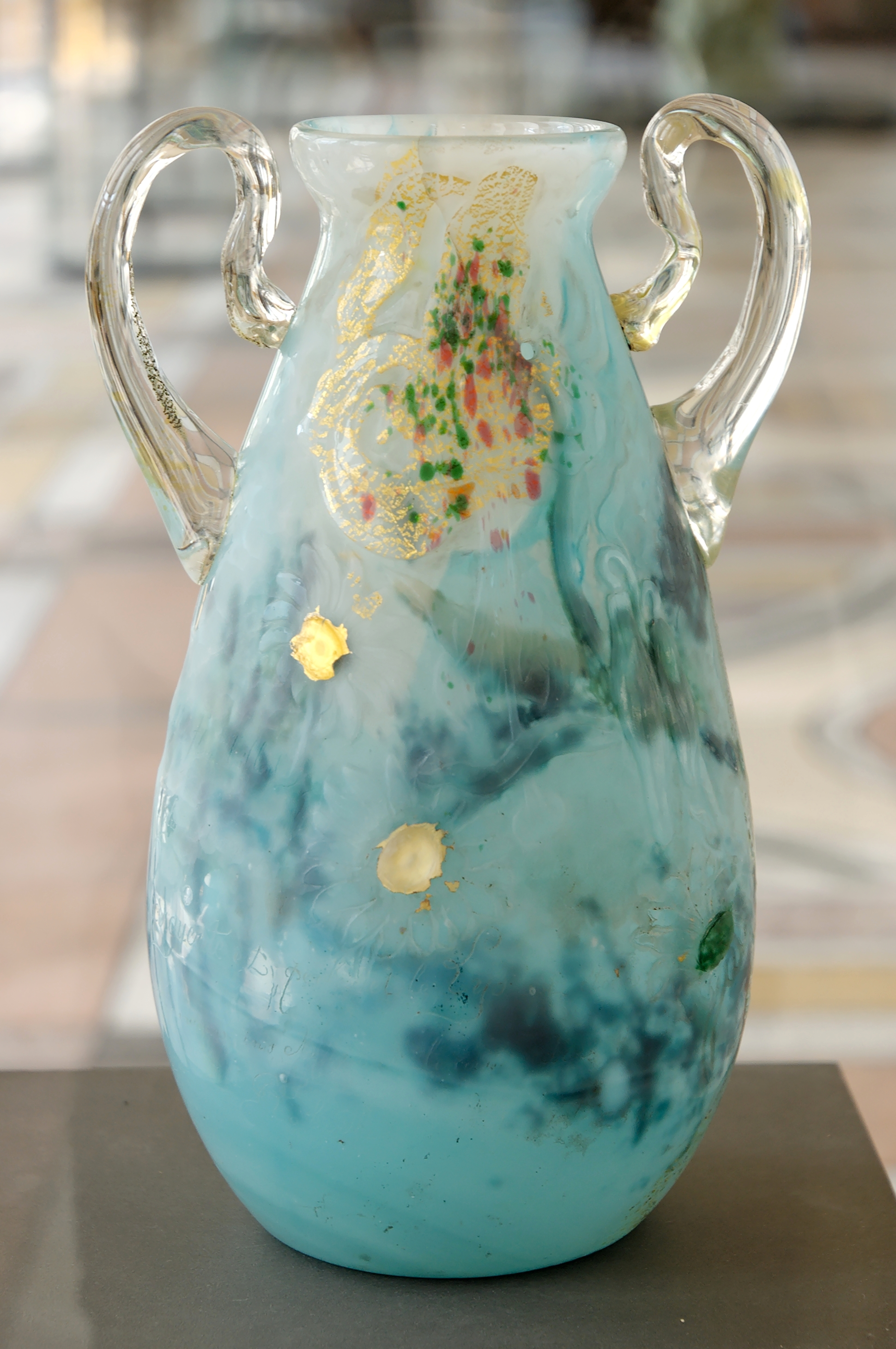
Vase with lilies and daises, multi-layered blown crystal with inclusions of glass and gold dust, cabochons and handles added on and fused (1896) (Petit Palais)

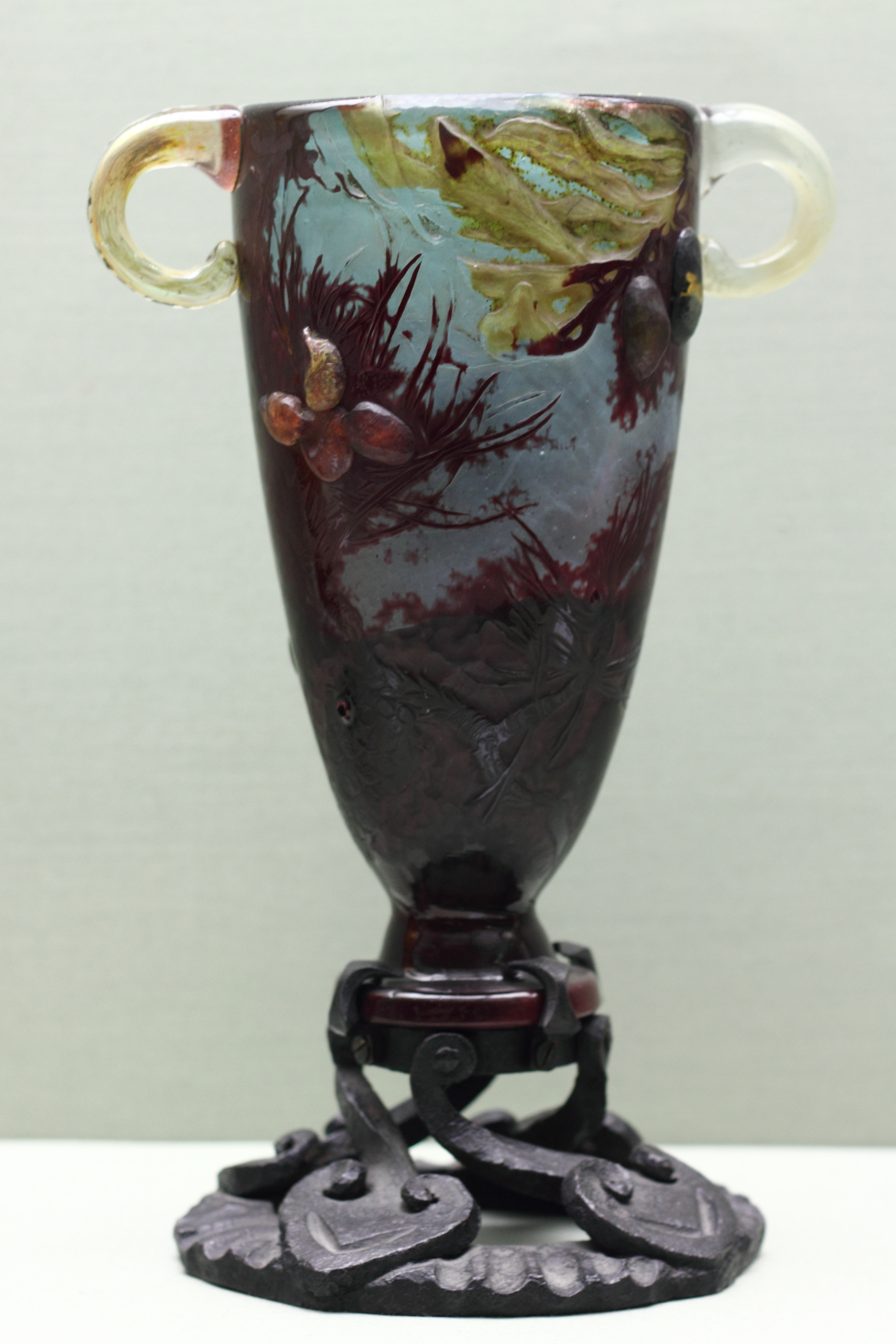
Canthare vase, with design by Victor Prouvé (1896)

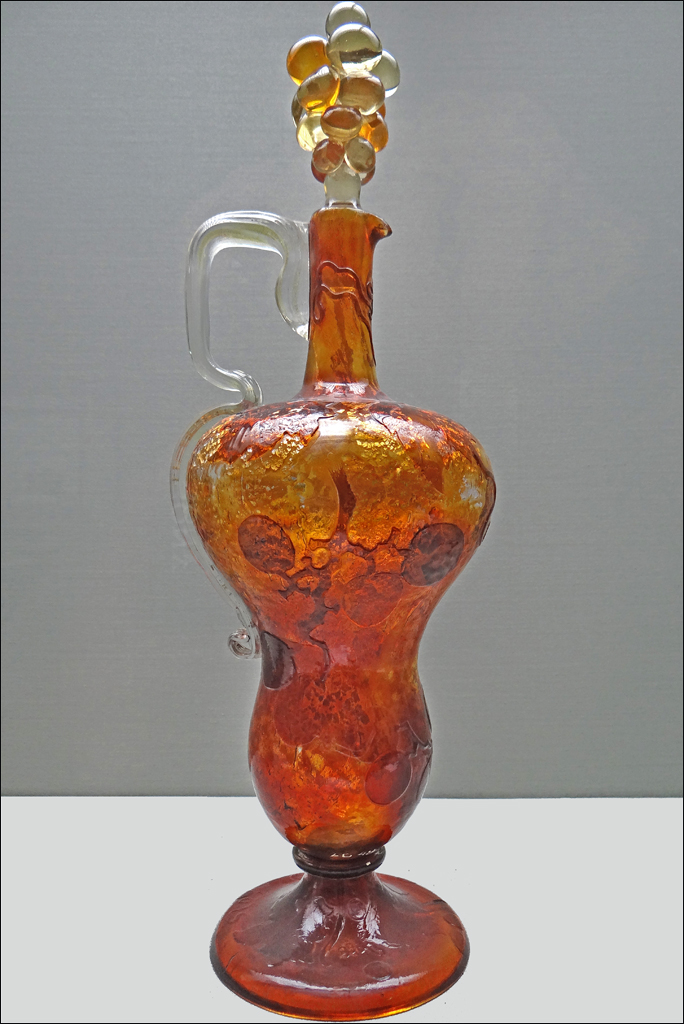
Cruche raisin, with multiple layers of glass, engraved, applied decoration and inclusions of colored glass dust (1896) (Musée de l'Ecole de Nancy)

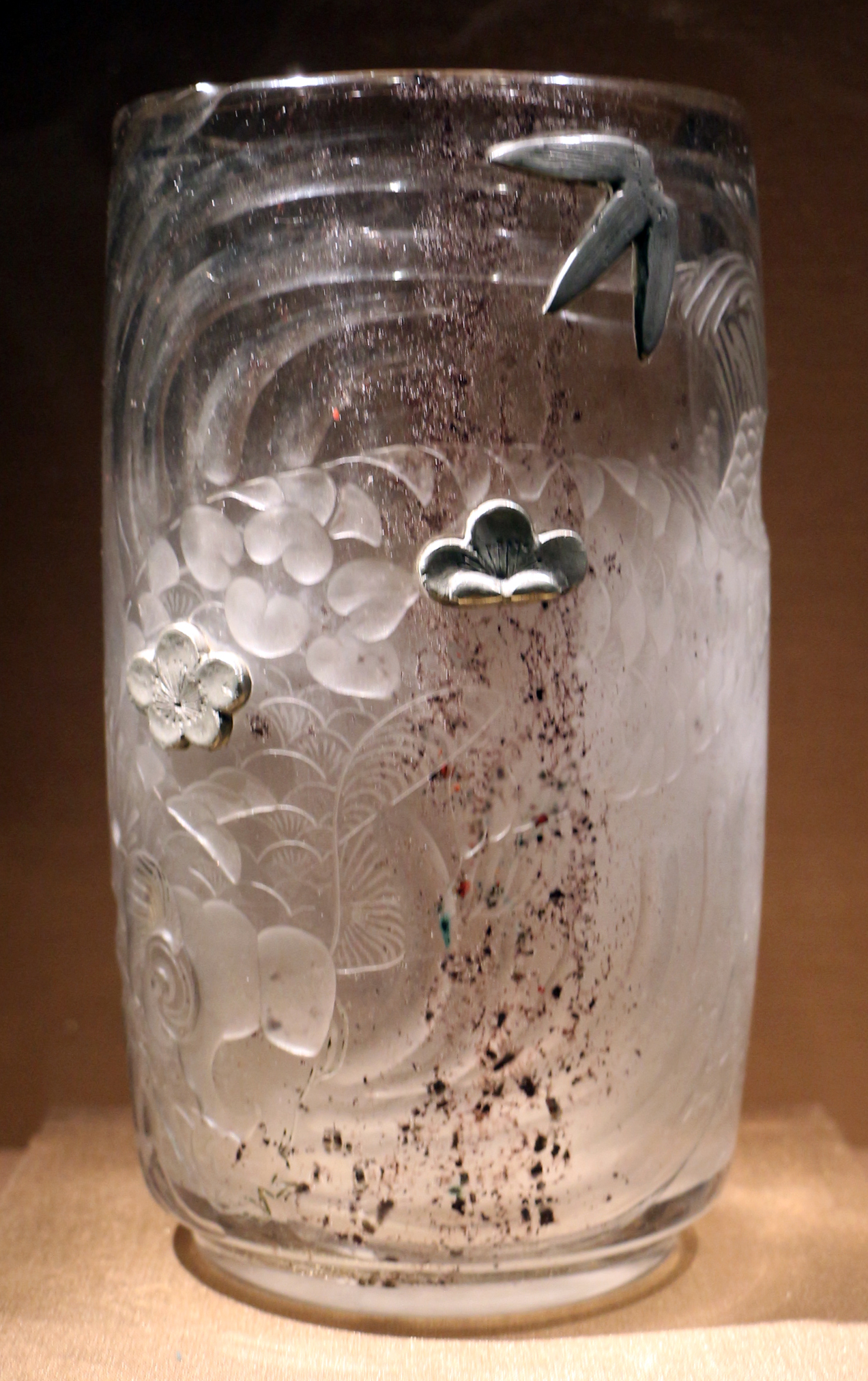
Glass Vase in imitation of rock crystal, with inclusions of colored glass dust (1889)

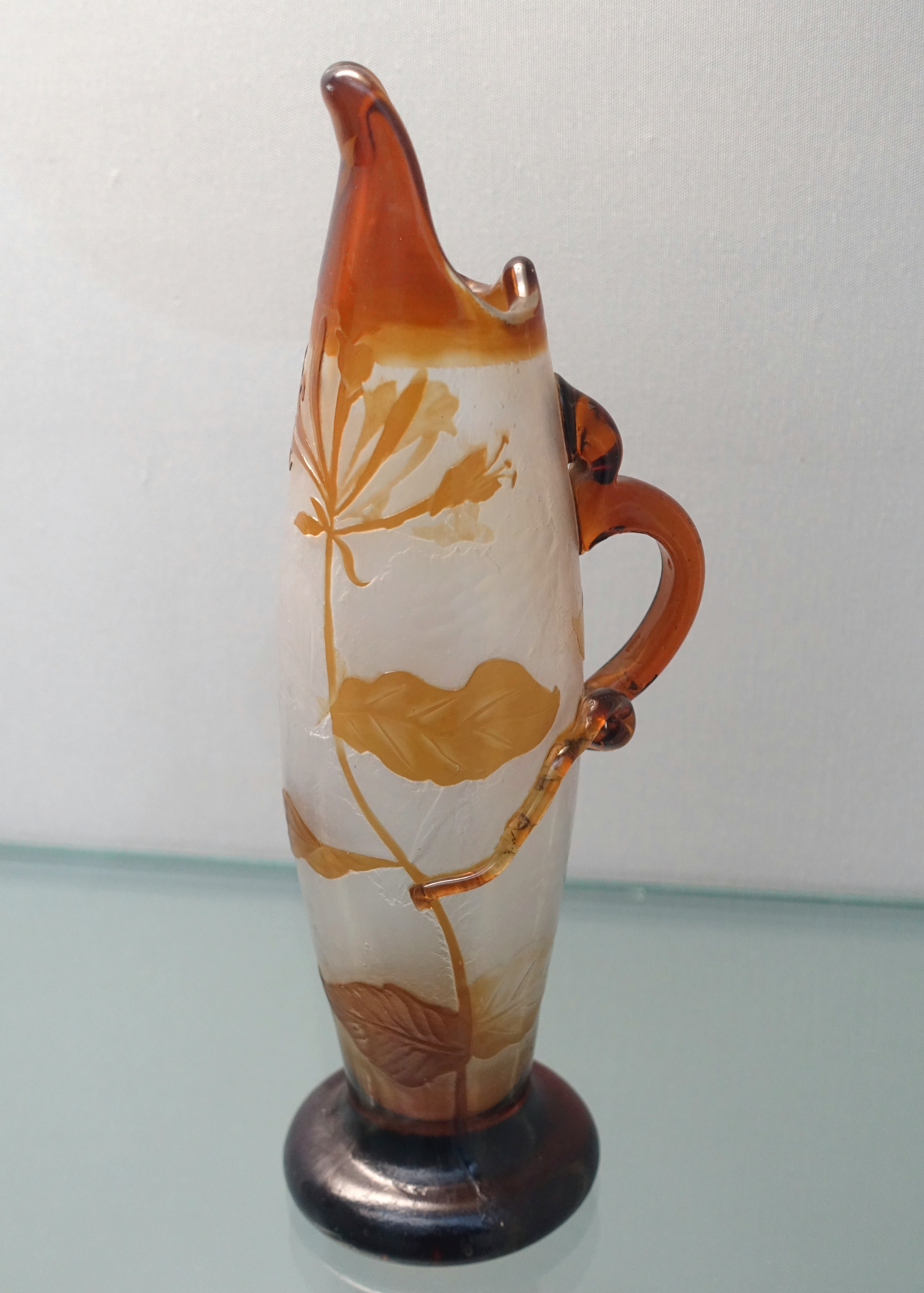
Glass pitcher (1896) (Brohan Museum, Berlin)

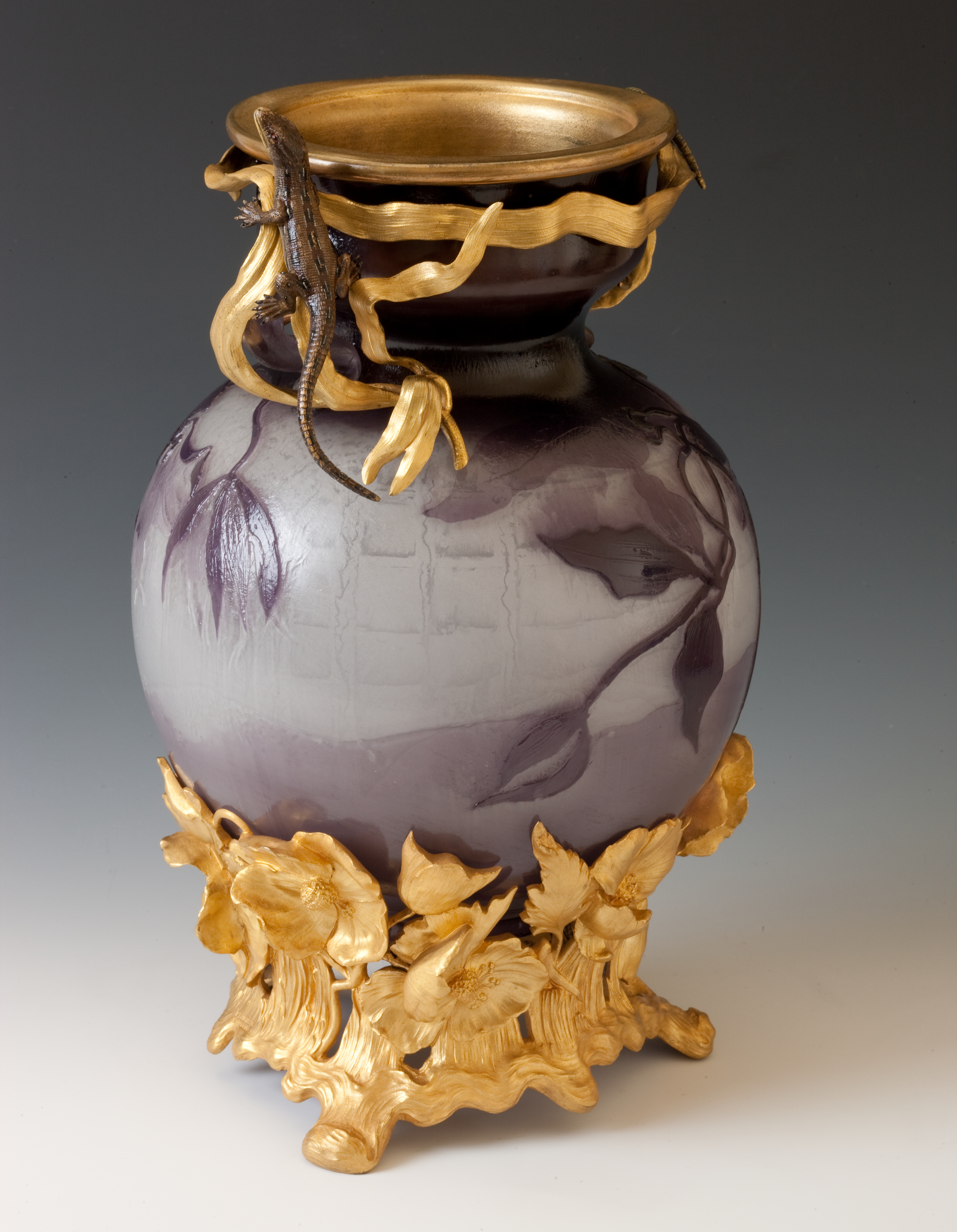
Coloured glass vase with coating decoration (1900), National Museum in Kraków

=== Colors ===
Gallé was particularly innovative in the creation and use of colored glass. As early as 1878 he colored glass with a small quantity of cobalt oxide to make a delicate sapphire tone which he called "Clair de lune", or "moonlight". He sometimes covered this with a glaze of cobalt blue. It was widely imitated by other glassmakers, particularly in Germany and England, where it was called "Mondschein", or "moonlight". He wrote that he created "yellows, some iridescent browns and greens with a base of silver and sulphur, a peacock blue with copper and iron, browns from sulphur and catechu." He also tried out rare metals such as thallium and iridium, which made particularly dark shadows. His most original and characteristic colors were a deep violet made with manganese, usually on an opaline ground; a pink made with selenium or copper, which he created 1889; and a green made with chromium, which he used to case pieces in three or four layers, giving nn exceptional depth and richness of color.

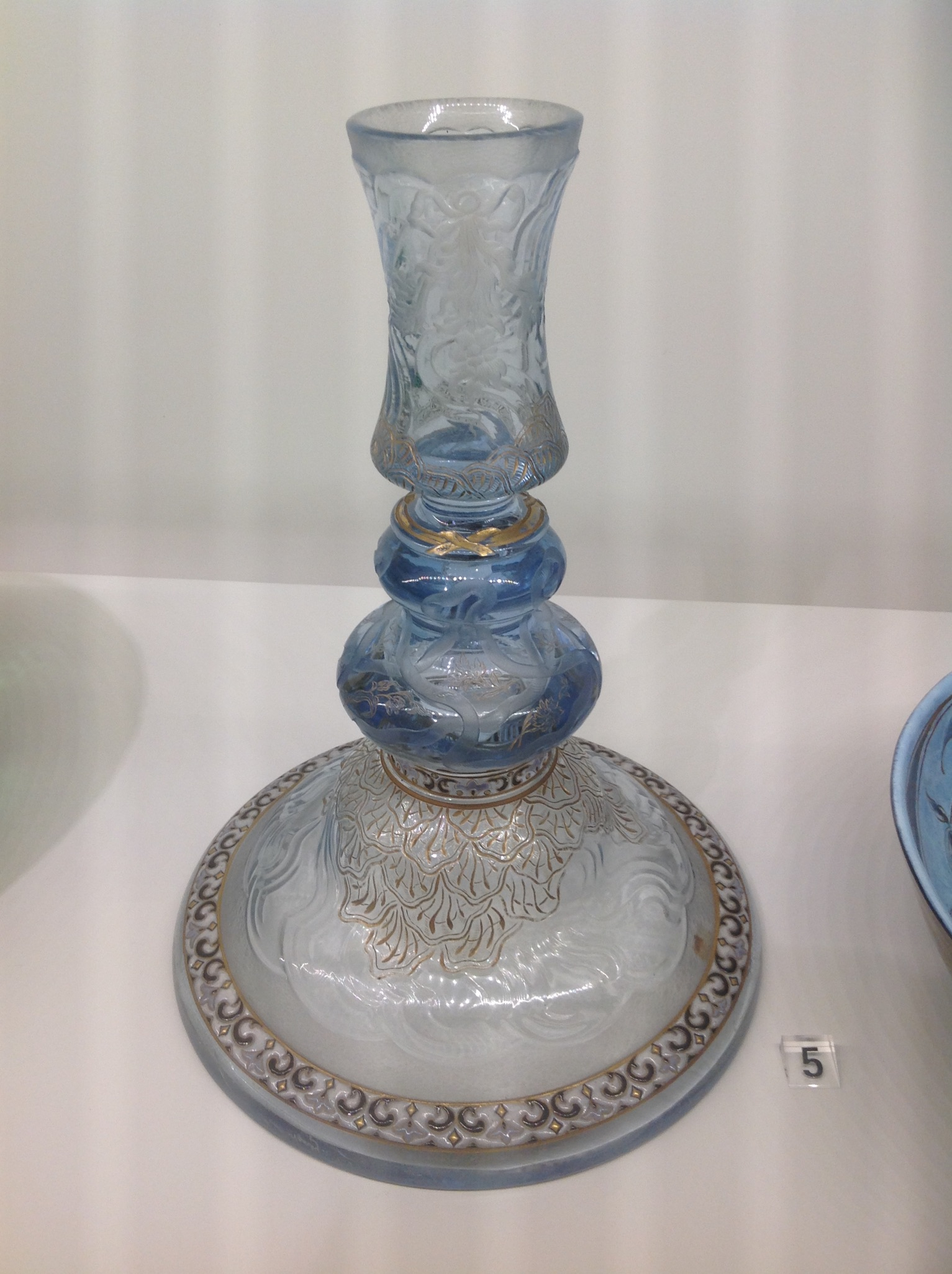
"Moonlight blue" vase, blown, molded, enamelled and engraved on wheel (1884)

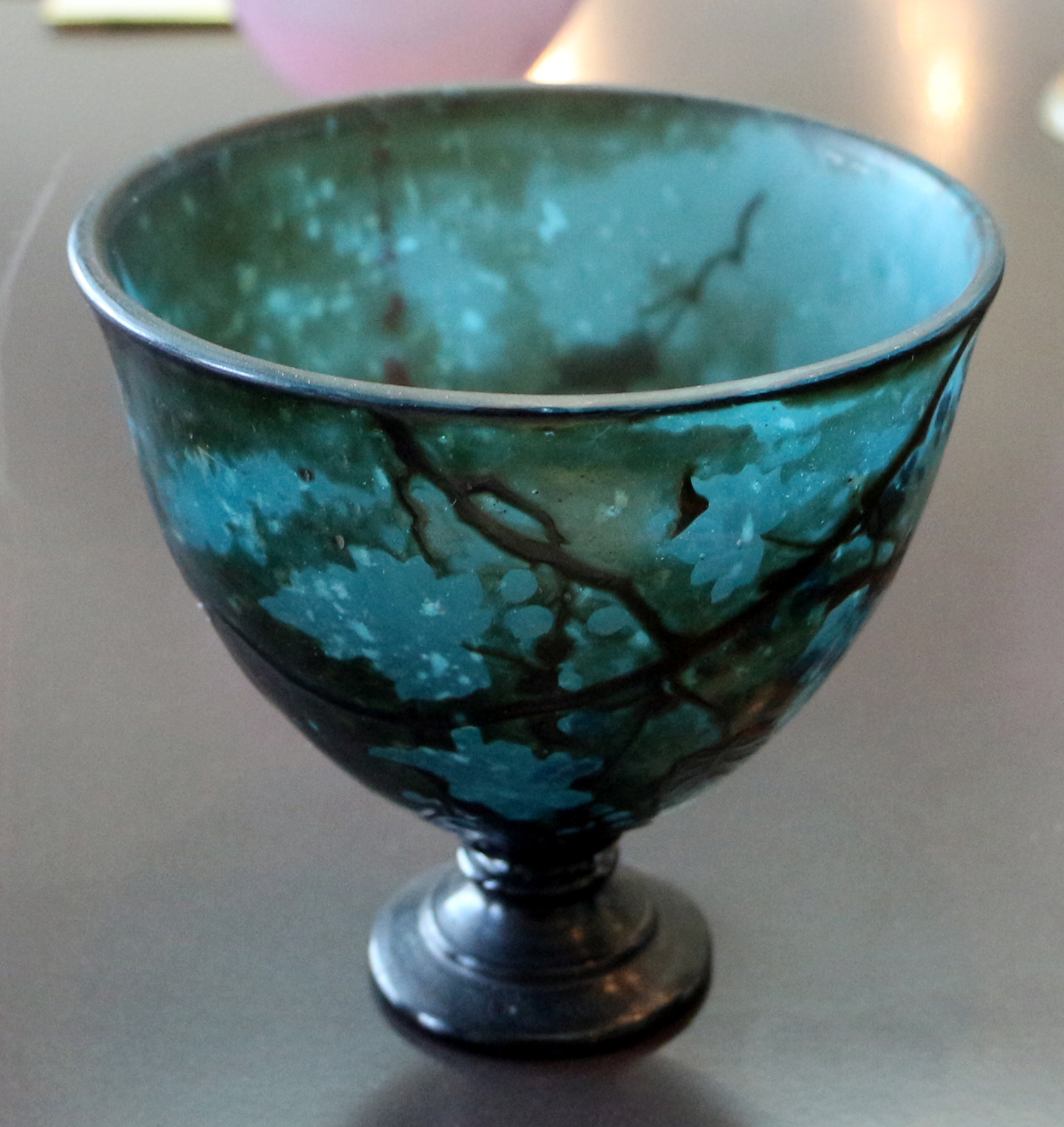
Cup with "Peacock blue" (1894)

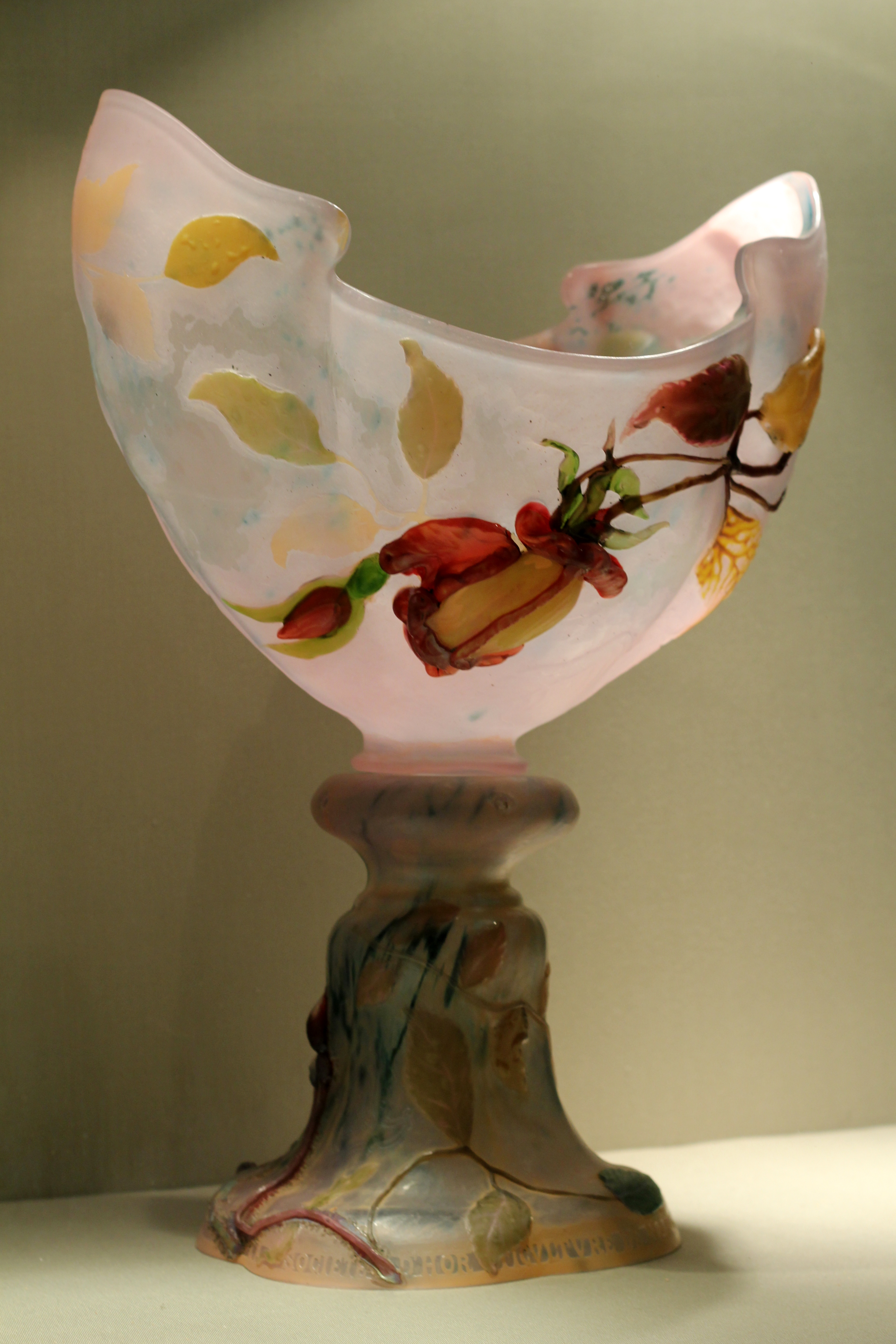
"Rose de France" cup (1901) (Musée de l'Ecole de Nancy)

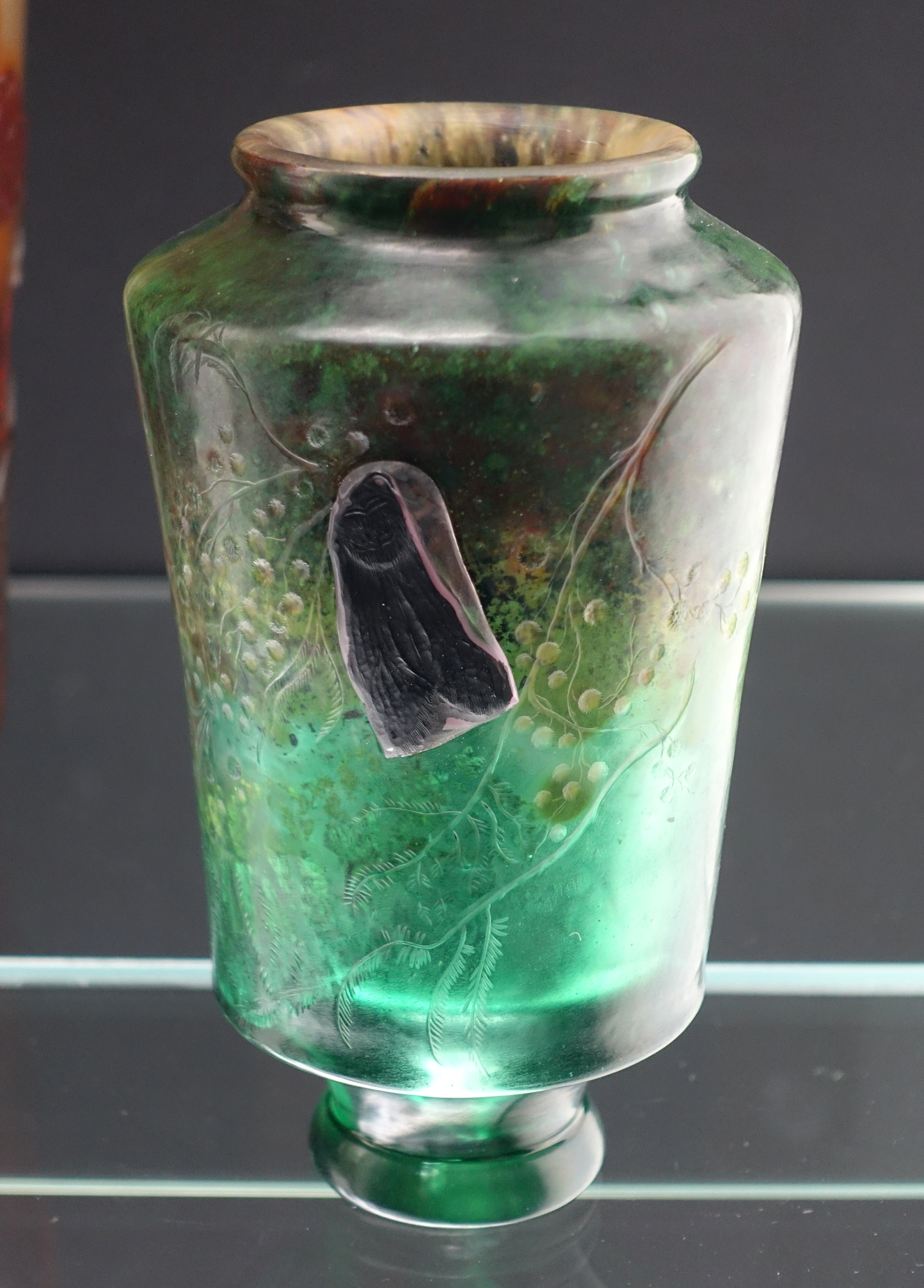
Vase with chromium green (1898) (Brohan Museum)

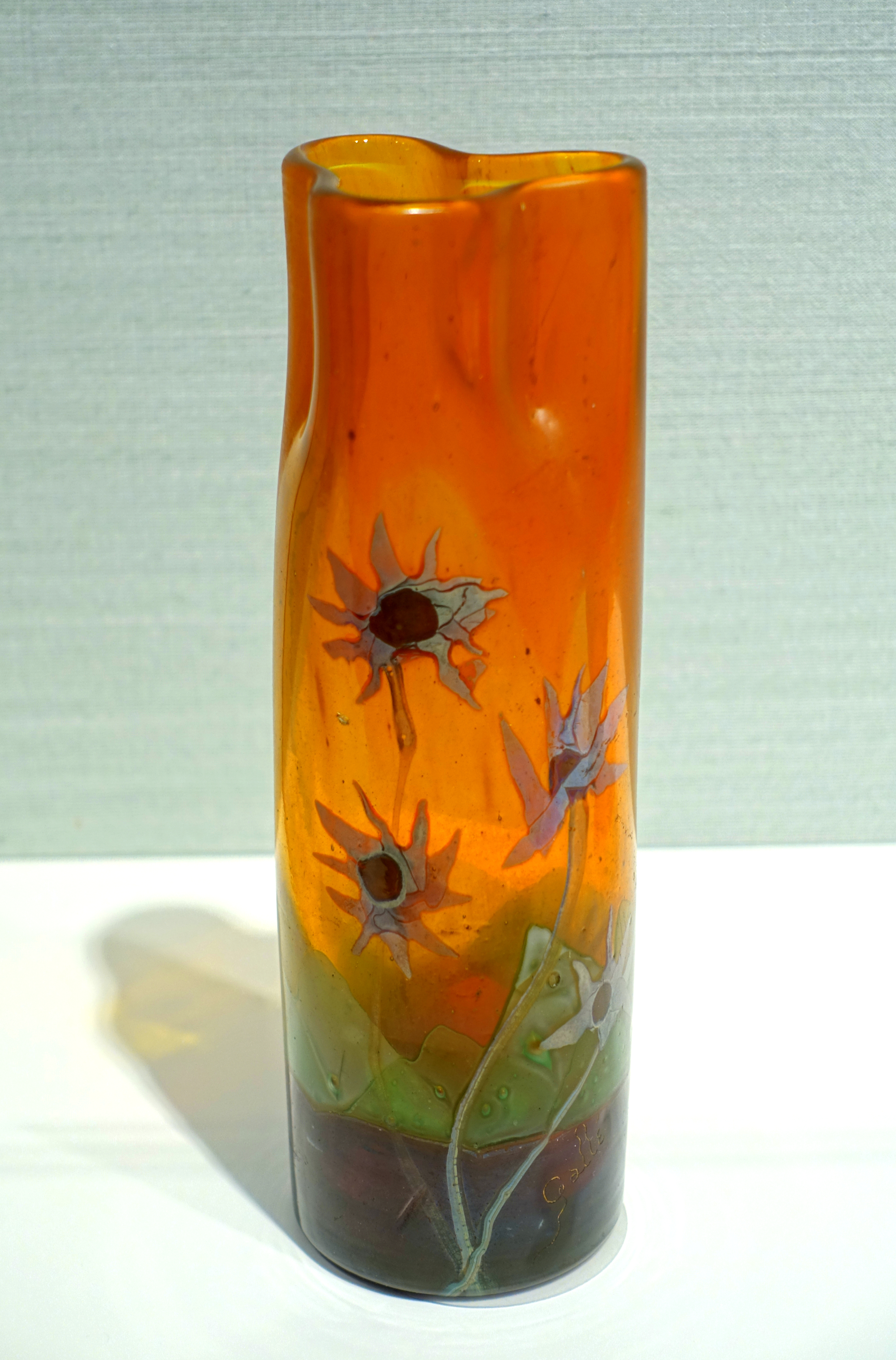
Cylindrical vase with flowers (Darmstadt Colony Museum)

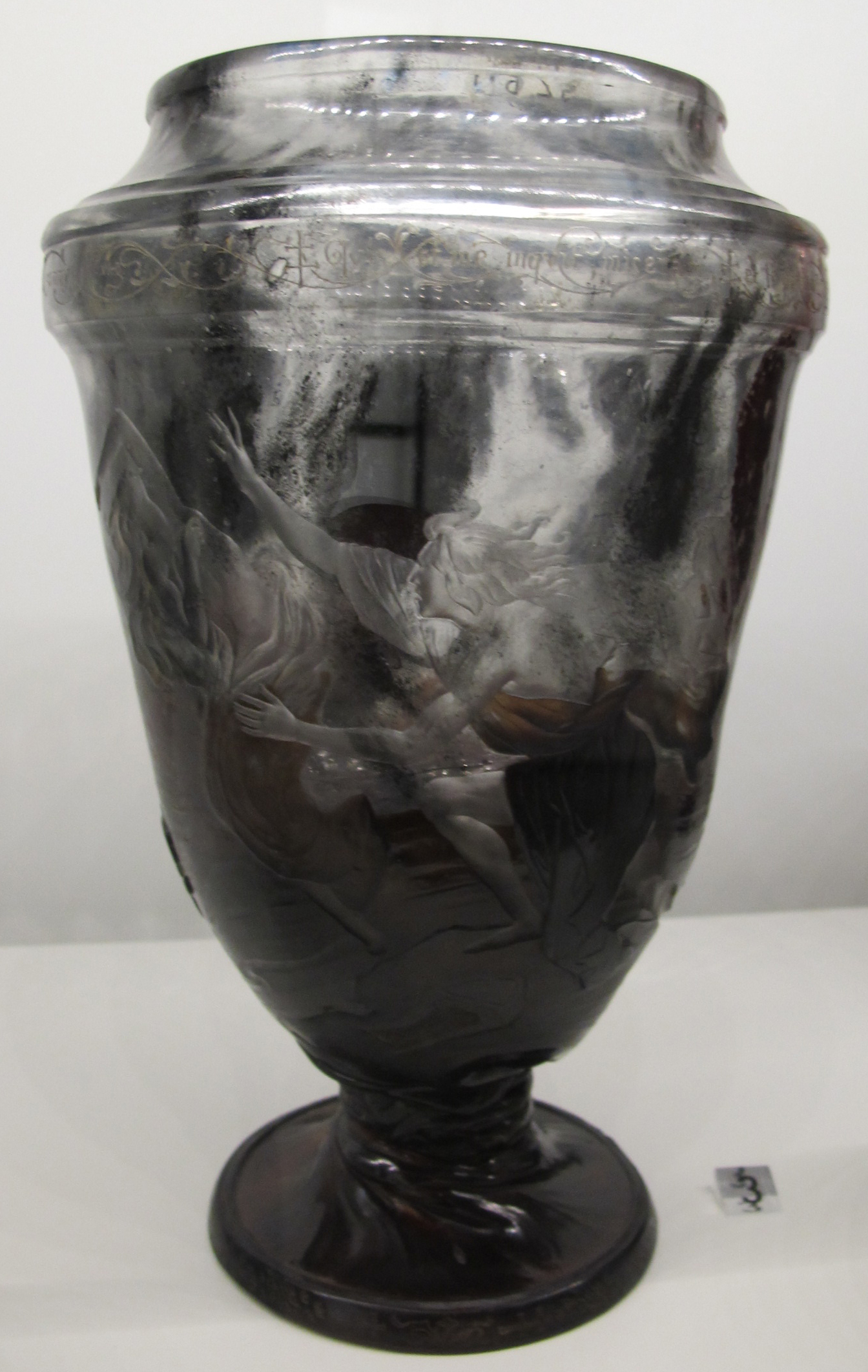
"Orpheus" vase, with art by Victor Prouvé (1888–89)

His style, with its emphasis on naturalism and floral motifs, was at the forefront of the emerging Art Nouveau movement.

His early work was executed using clear glass decorated with enamel, but he soon turned to an original style featuring heavy, opaque glass carved or etched with plant motifs, often in two or more colors as cameo glass.

He continued to incorporate experimental techniques into his work, such as metallic foils and air bubbles, and also revitalized the glass industry by establishing a workshop to mass-produce his, and other artists', designs.

=== Flowers ===
A large number of his glass works, especially vases, are inspired by and named for flowers. He was a dedicated botanist, and had an extensive flower garden at this residence as a source of models. He also required his artists to use actual plants as models if they were depicting them. They also had a strong symbolic appeal for Gallé. He wrote in 1893 that according to Saint Paul each flower and fruit has a particular symbolic meaning; the olive leaf is peace, wheat is charity and goodness; the grape is the symbol of the Eucharist; the fig is generosity; the Veronica flower is fidelity, the myrtle is joy, the narcissus is springtime in nature, and so forth.

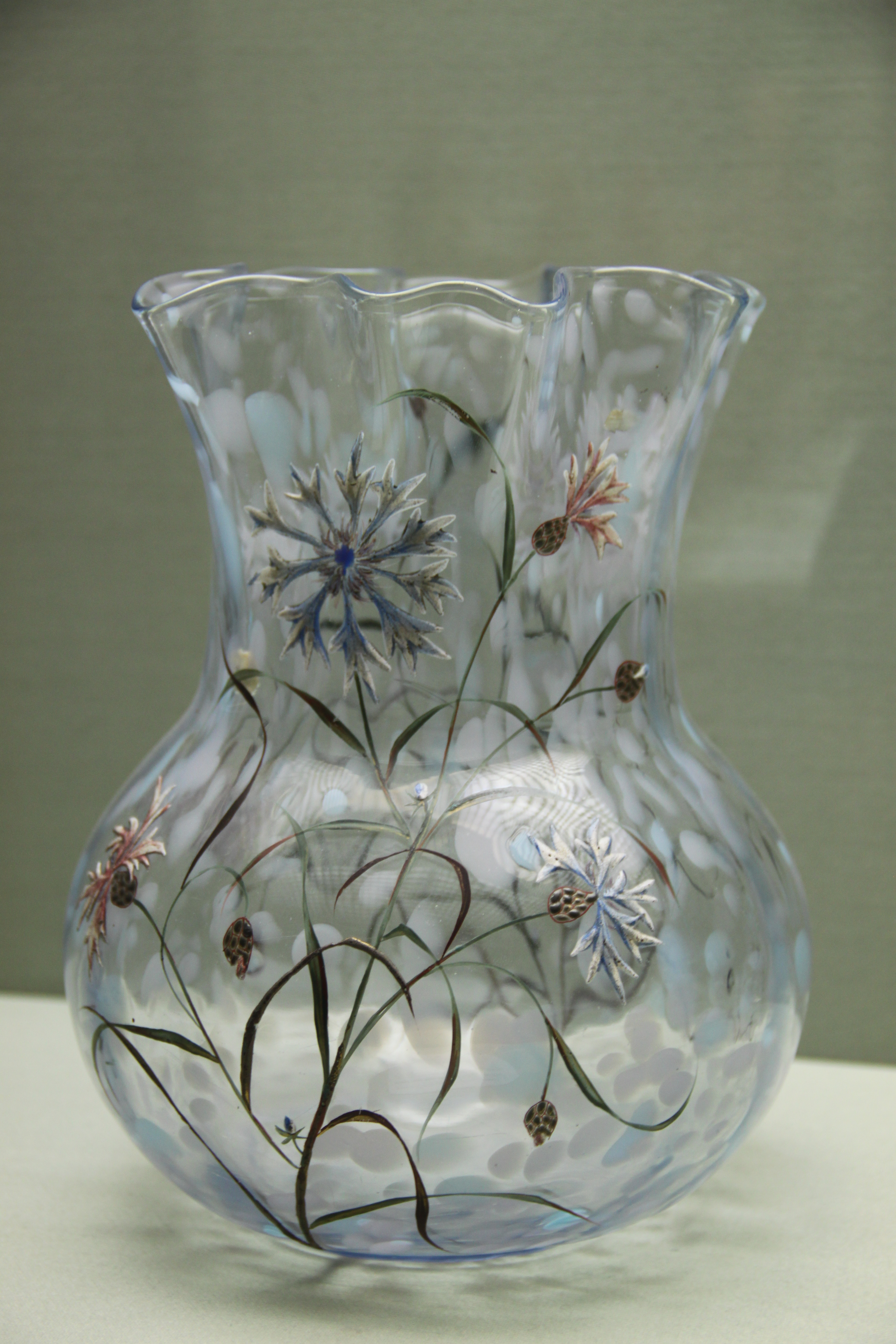
Vase with Bleuet flowers, "Moonlight blue" polychrome glass with enamel flowers, speckles (1879)

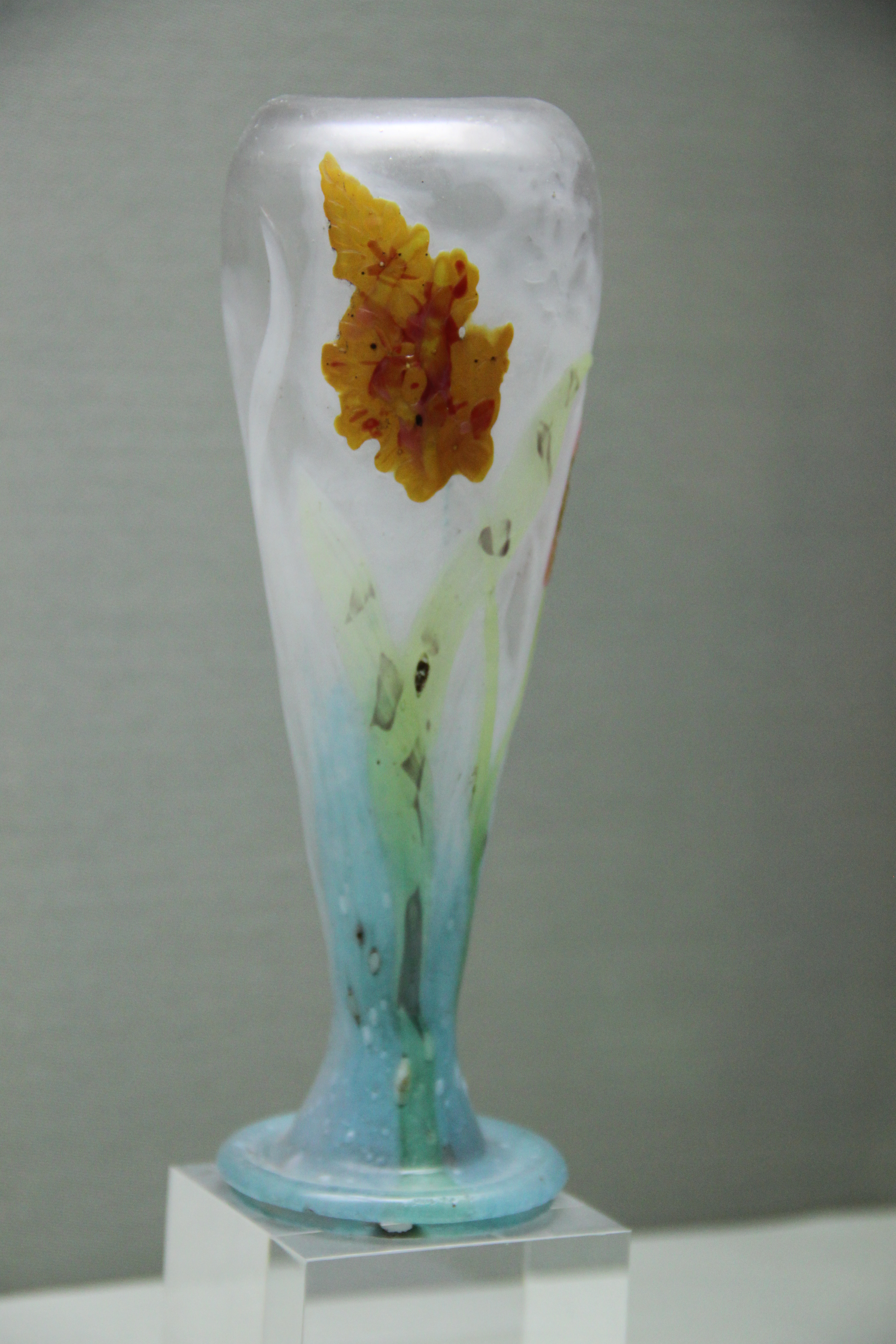
Orchid vase (1897). Multiple layers of glass, engraved, marquetry

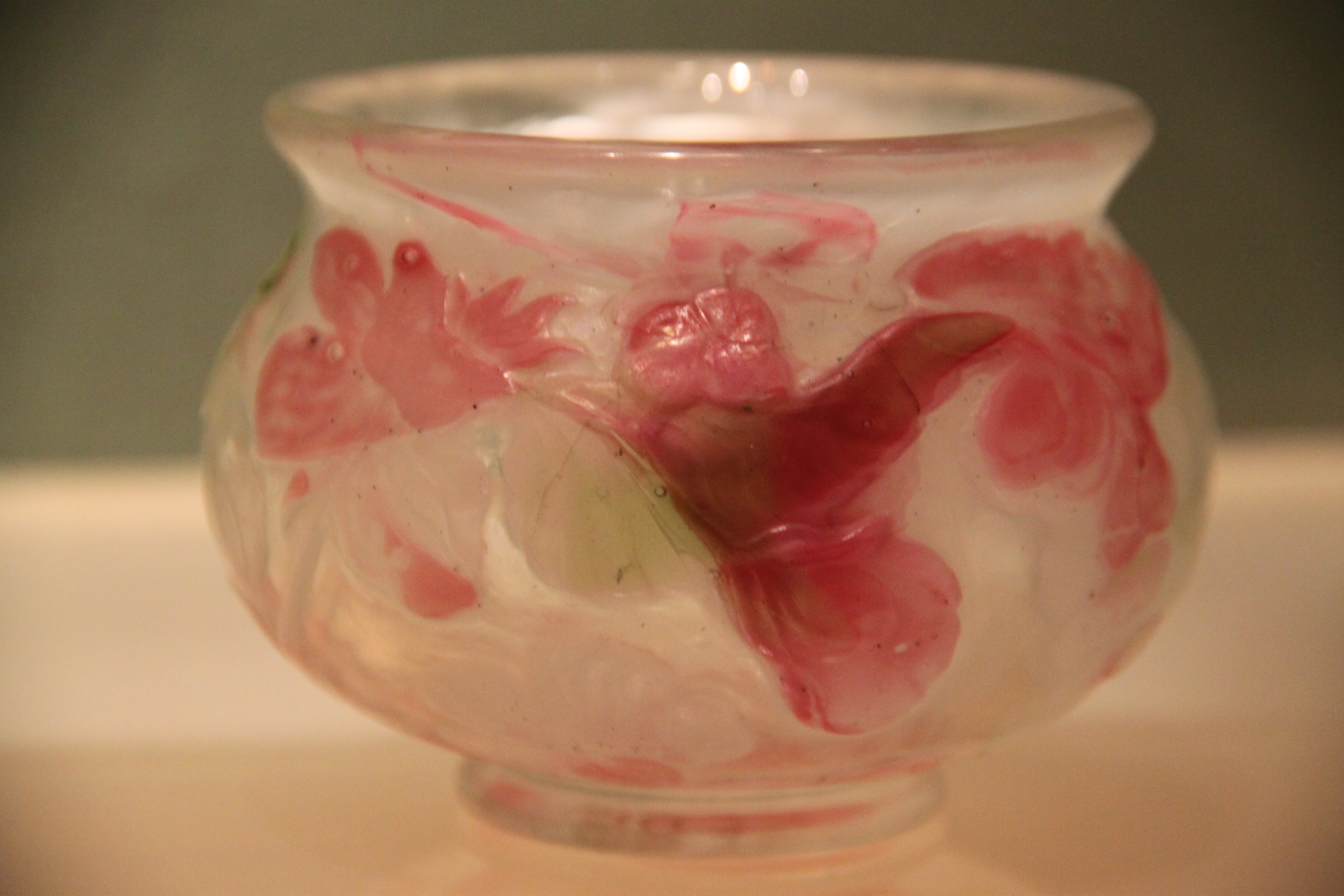
Begonia rose flower cup (1894) (Musee d'Ecole de Nancy). Several layers of glass, engraved, glass marquetry and applications

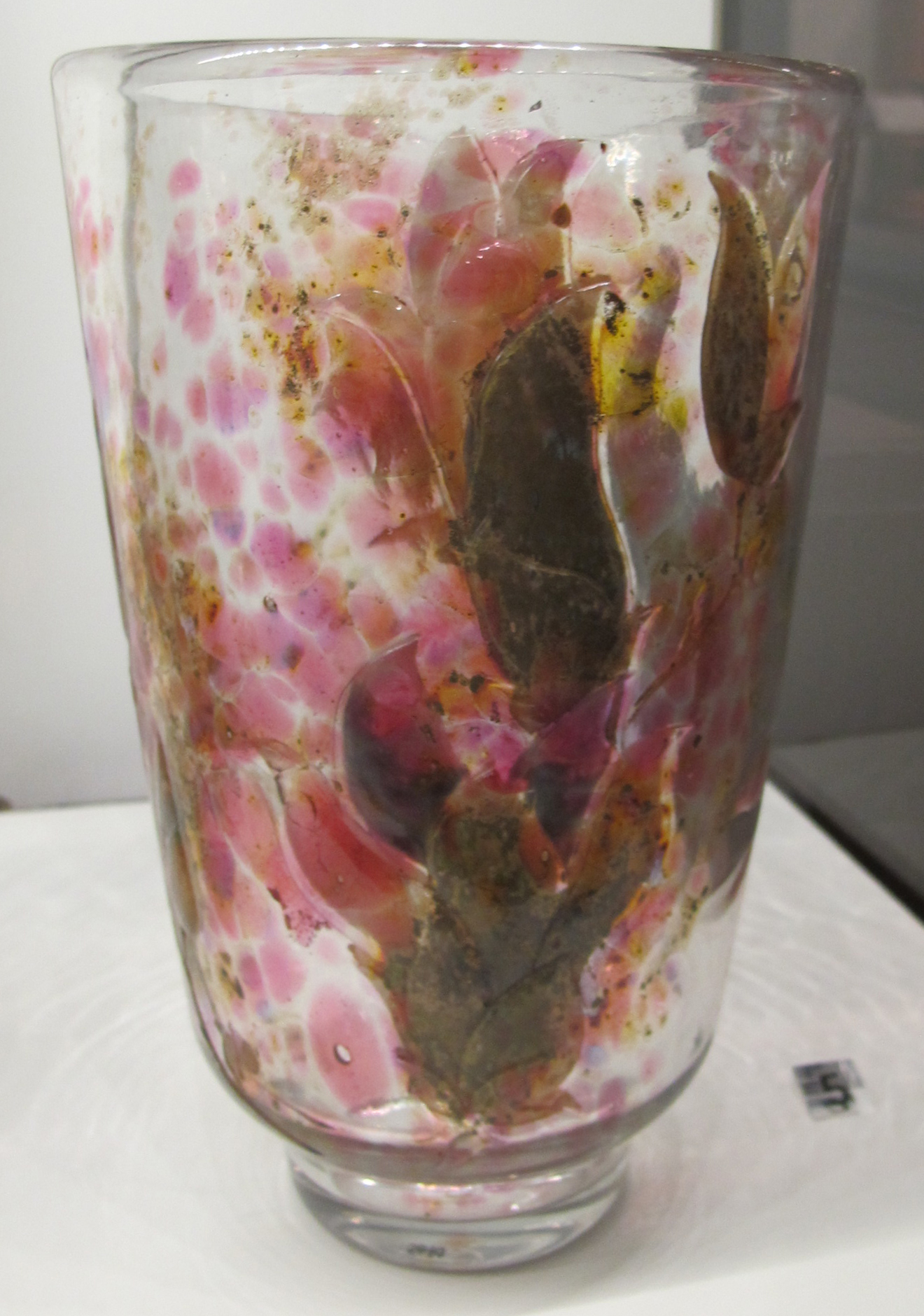
Magnolia vase (1889), (Musée des Arts Decoratifs)

=== Insects and undersea worlds ===
Natural subjects were always present in his work. Flower, plants, insects and marine creatures were frequent subjects; he created vases that seemed to be brimming with fish and other animals, and others with forest scenes abounding with colorful dragonflies and other insects.

Curator William Warmus, writing in the exhibition catalog Emile Gallé: Dreams into Glass, noted that "The extent to which Gallé depended on nature for his decorative themes is revealed in this catalog- there is no single object that does not draw on nature. Nearly every piece includes plant life...But no pieces are slavish imitations. Instead, nature served Gallé as a launch pad, allowing him to break away from tradition and reach new heights: "The jury will please note that Gallé always takes nature as his point of departure, and that he takes pains to free himself from it in time to attain a personal character and accent." (In: Emile Gallé, Ecrits Pour L'Art, p. 317).

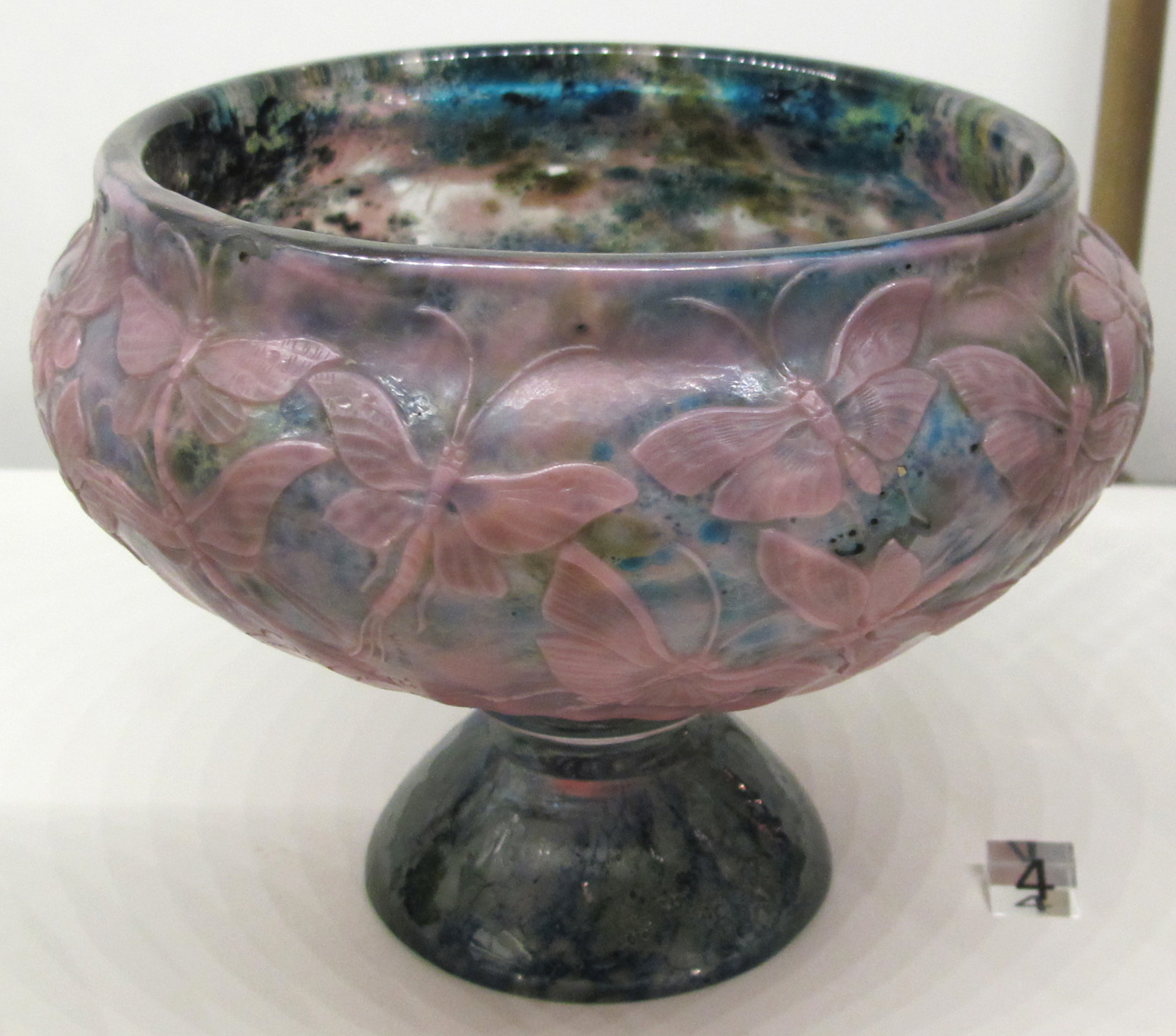
Cup, "Flight of the Mayflies" (1889)

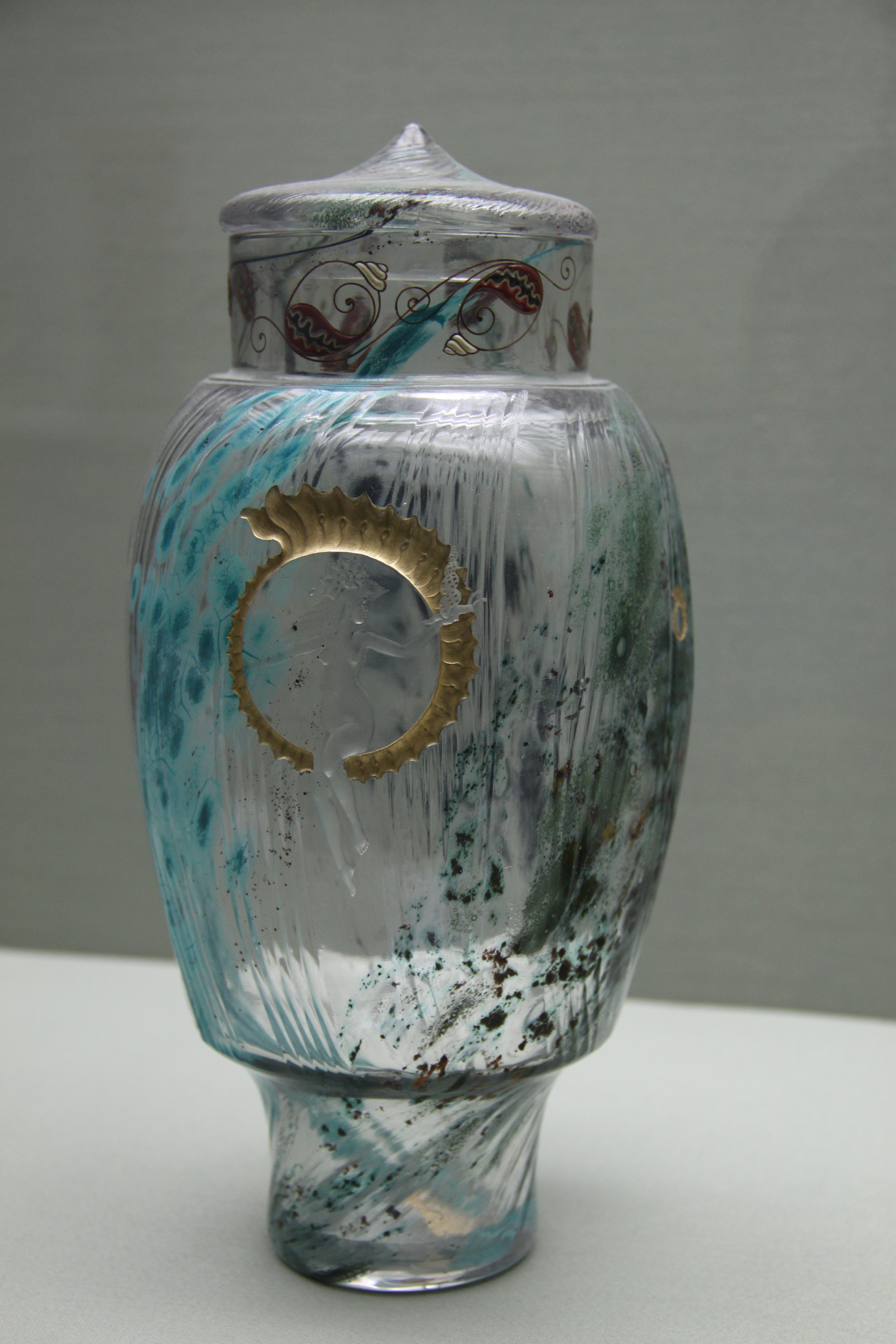
Covered pot with marine decor. (1899–92). Glass engraved and gilded, inclusions of colored pigments, polychrome enamel decoration

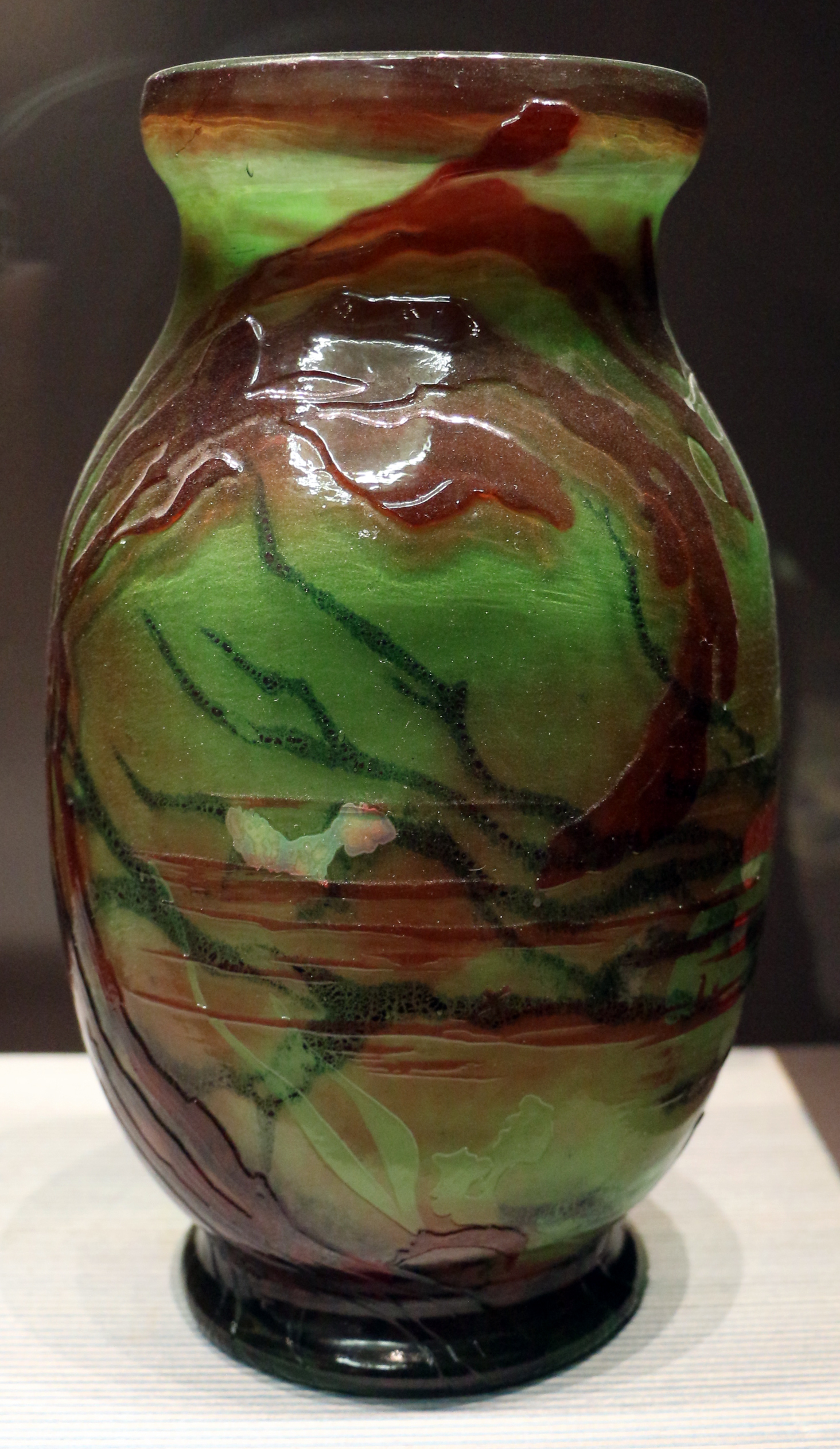
"Seaweed" vase (1899–1900)

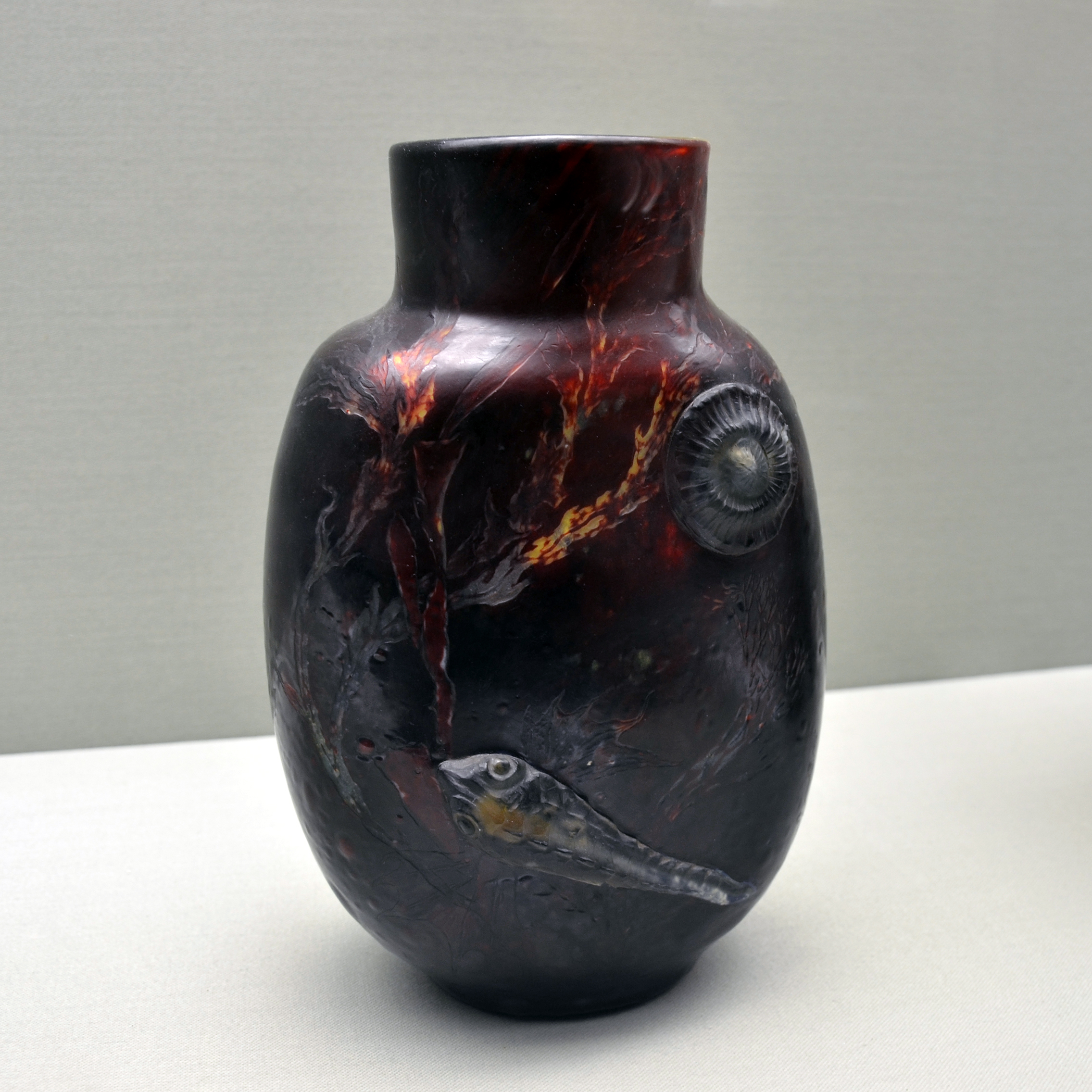
"Depths of the Sea" vase. Several layers of glass, metallic inclusions (Musée de l'Ecole de Nancy)

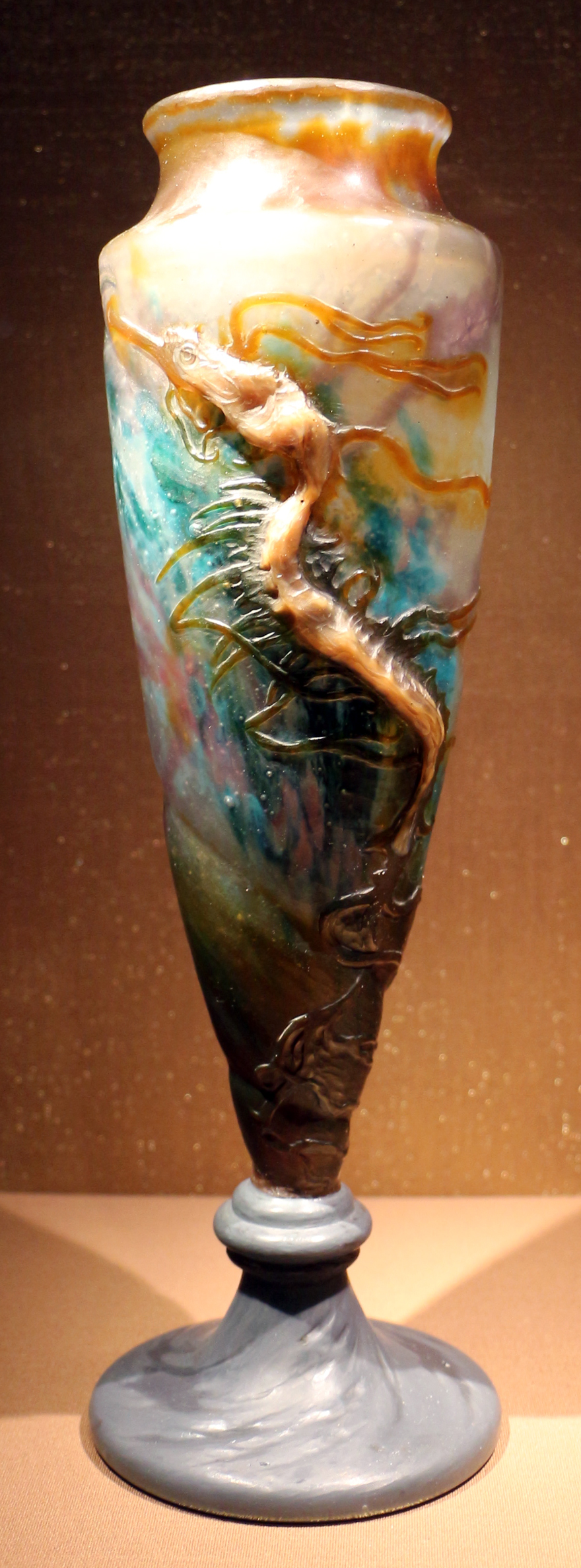
Sea horse or Sea Dragon vase (1901) (Fin-de-Siècle Museum, Brussels)

== Furniture ==
Gallé became interested in wood in 1885, when he was looking for exotic woods to make sculpted bases for his vases. He was intrigued by the extraordinary variety of colors and reflective qualities of the woods being imported into Europe from colonies around the world. Within a year, he had created his own furniture workshop, employing experienced carpenters, sculptors, varnishers and experts in marquetry, as well as craftsmen in bronze and iron to make the knobs, locks, and other hardware. He was aided in design by experienced collaborators such as Victor Prouvé. Unlike some designers of the Arts and Crafts movement, he was willing to use machine tools to speed up the manufacture, if it did not diminish the quality of the final product. He began to experiment, sculpting the locks, using patinas of bronze and heating the locks to get exactly the color he wanted. He created a collection of six hundred different varieties of wood. so he could create marquetry in exactly the color and shade, and nuances of the grain he wanted. By 1889 he was able to mount a very successful display of his furniture at the Paris Universal Exposition.

He described his inspiration for furniture design in a long article called "Contemporary furniture decorated following nature" published in the November–December 1900 issue of the Revue des Arts Decoratifs. He argued that true beauty could never be found "in the acceptance of the falseness and mediocrity of prettiness without character or in opulence without spirit." He argued that it could only be found in the concentrated application of the principles of structural and linear growth of Nature. Following this doctrine, every detail and motif in his furniture was taken directly from nature.

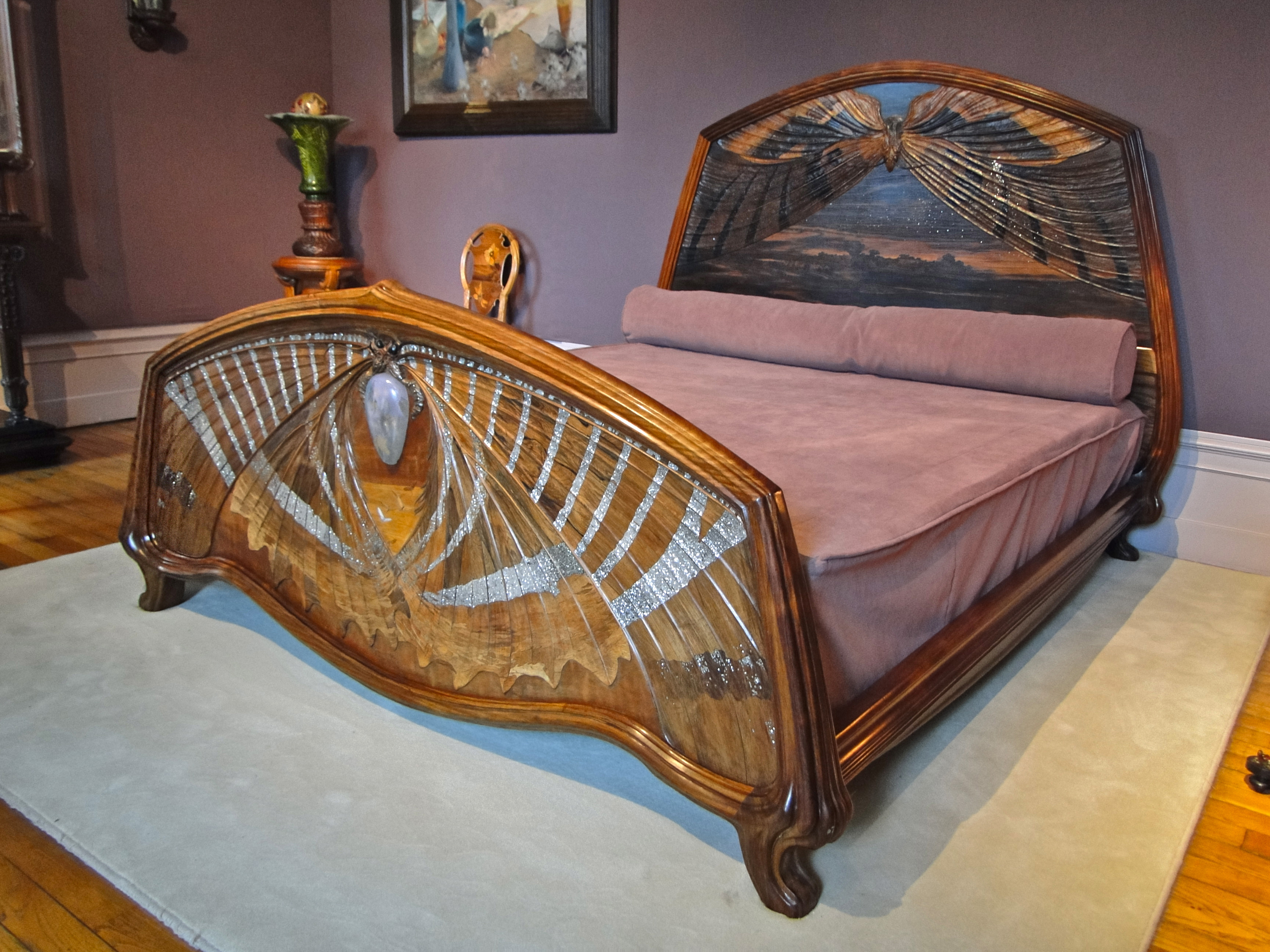
Dawn and Dusk Bed (1901). Dawn is illustrated by marquetry mayfly at the foot of the bed, dusk on the mayfly on the headboard (Musée de l'Ecole de Nancy)

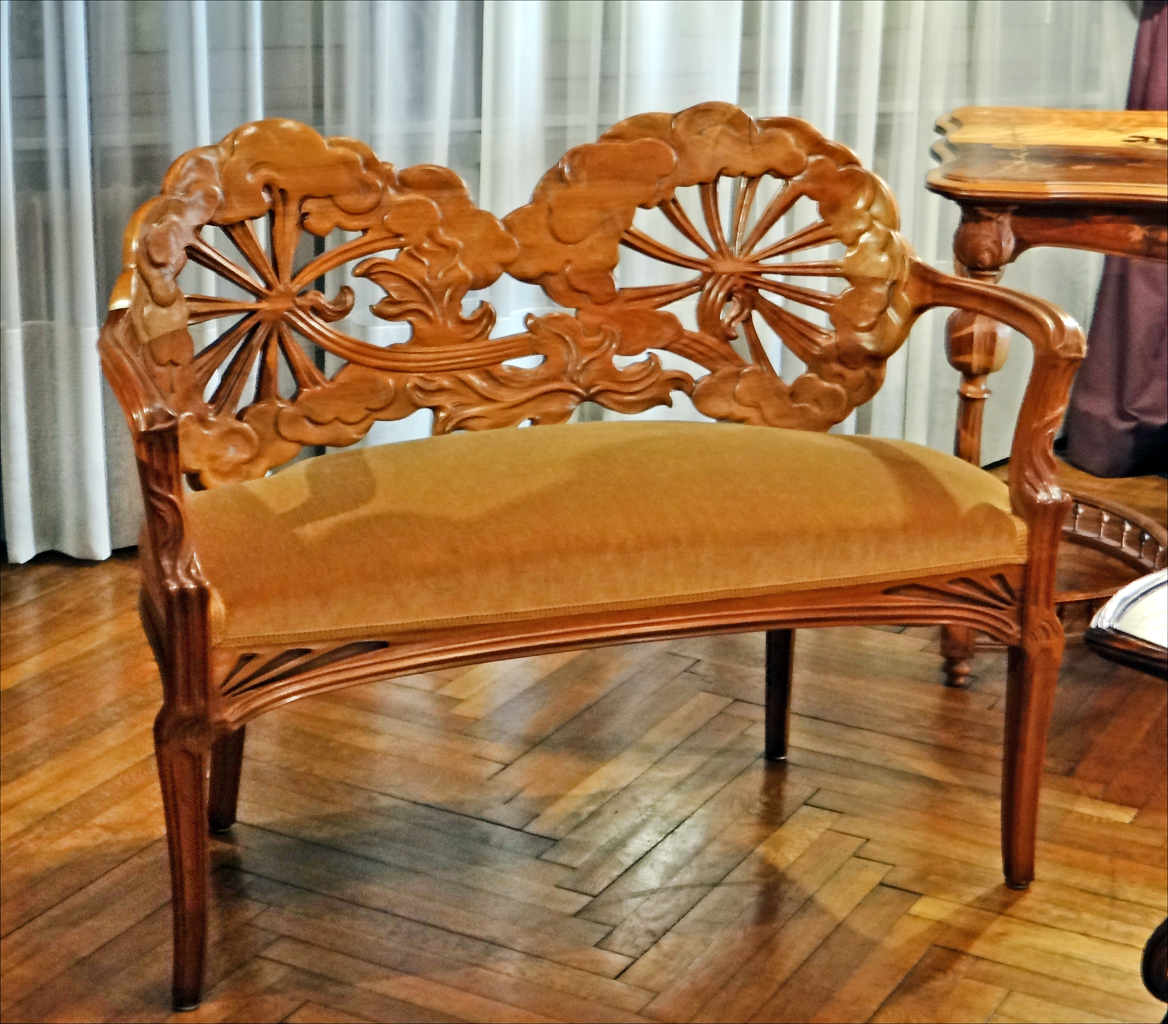
Seat with an umbel floral design (c. 1900), walnut (Musée de l'Ecole de Nancy)

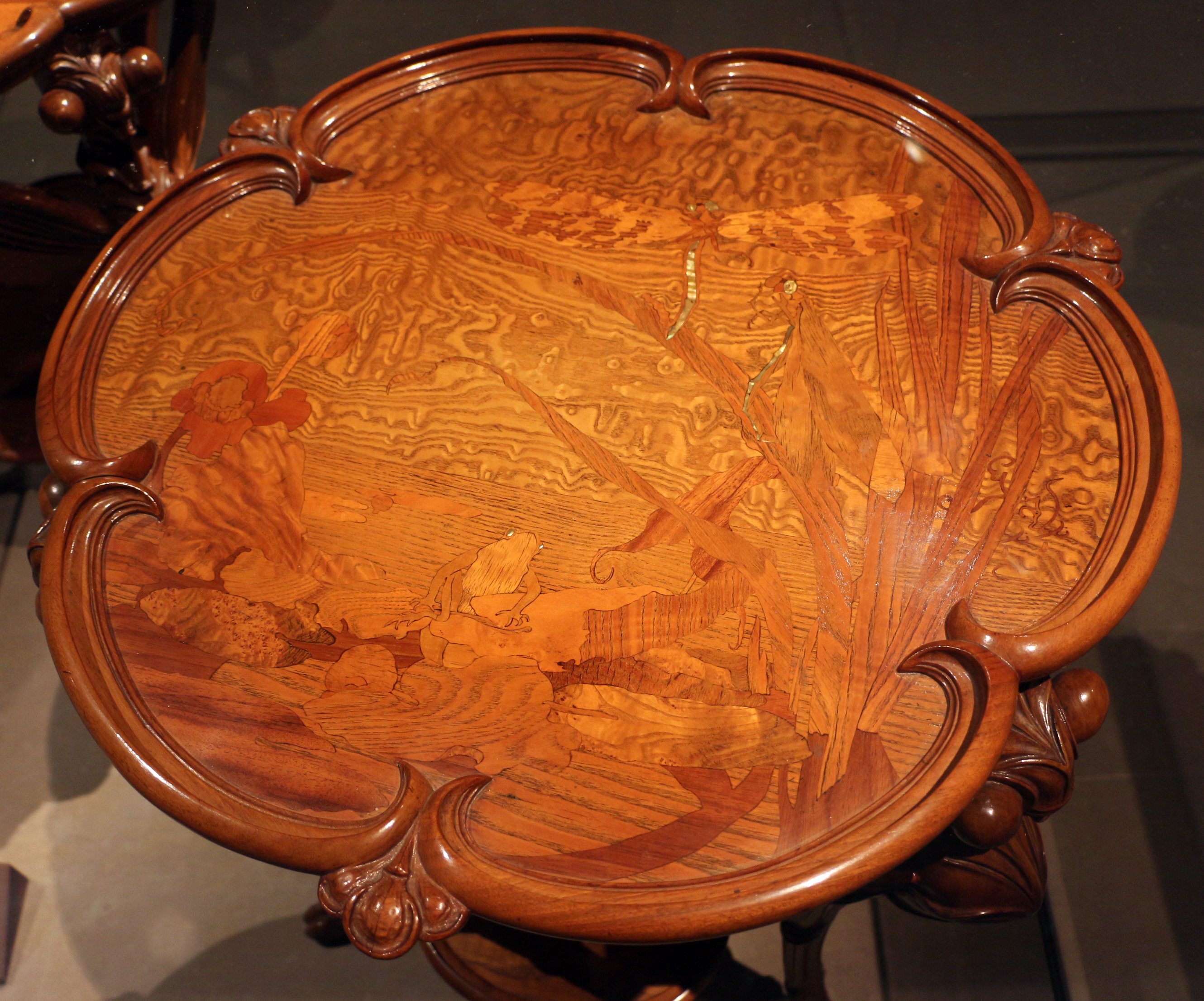
Marquetry table top with damselfly design (1900) (Fin de Siècle Museum, Brussels)

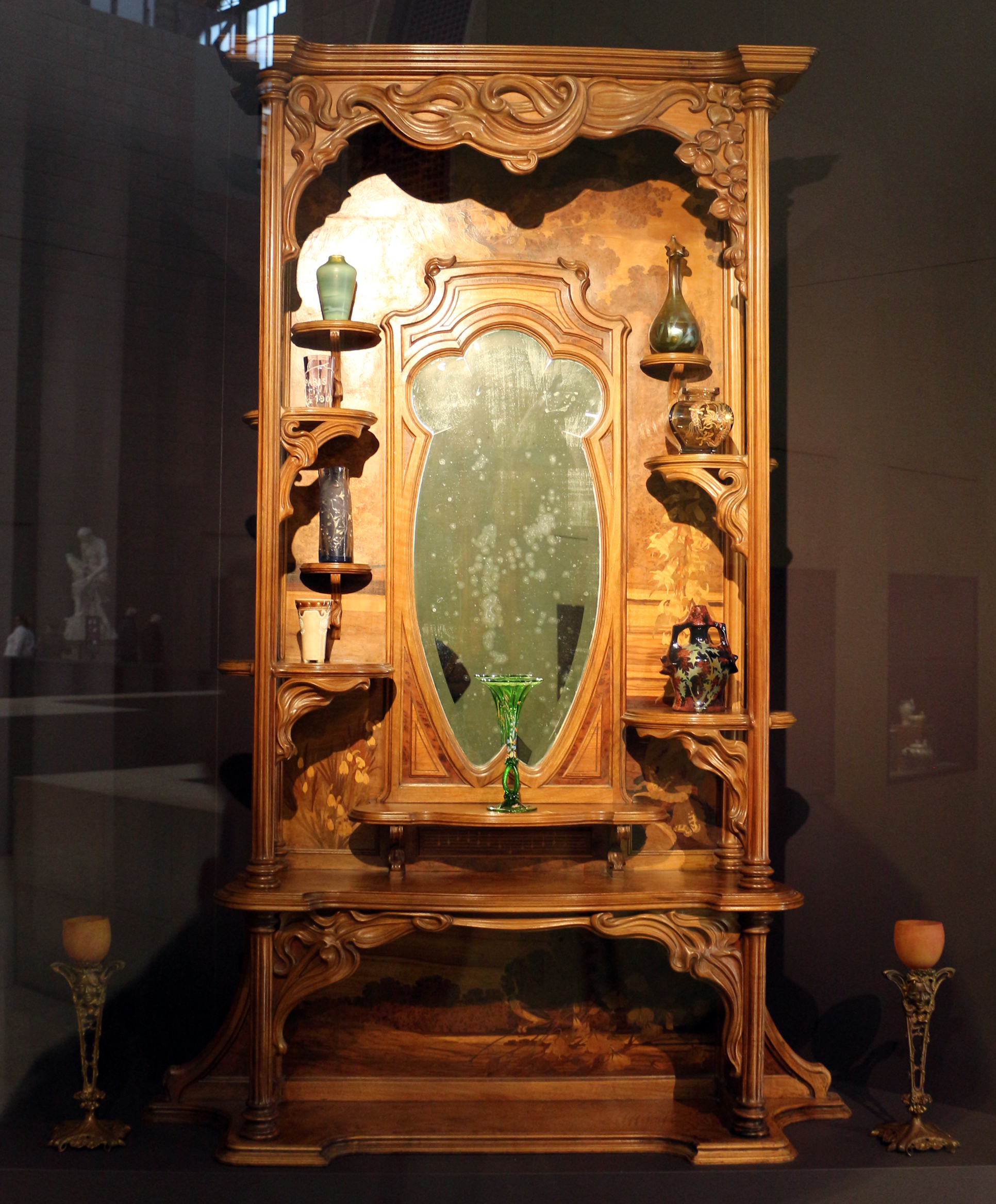
Hall cabinet with mirror, vases (1898–1900), (Musée d'Orsay)

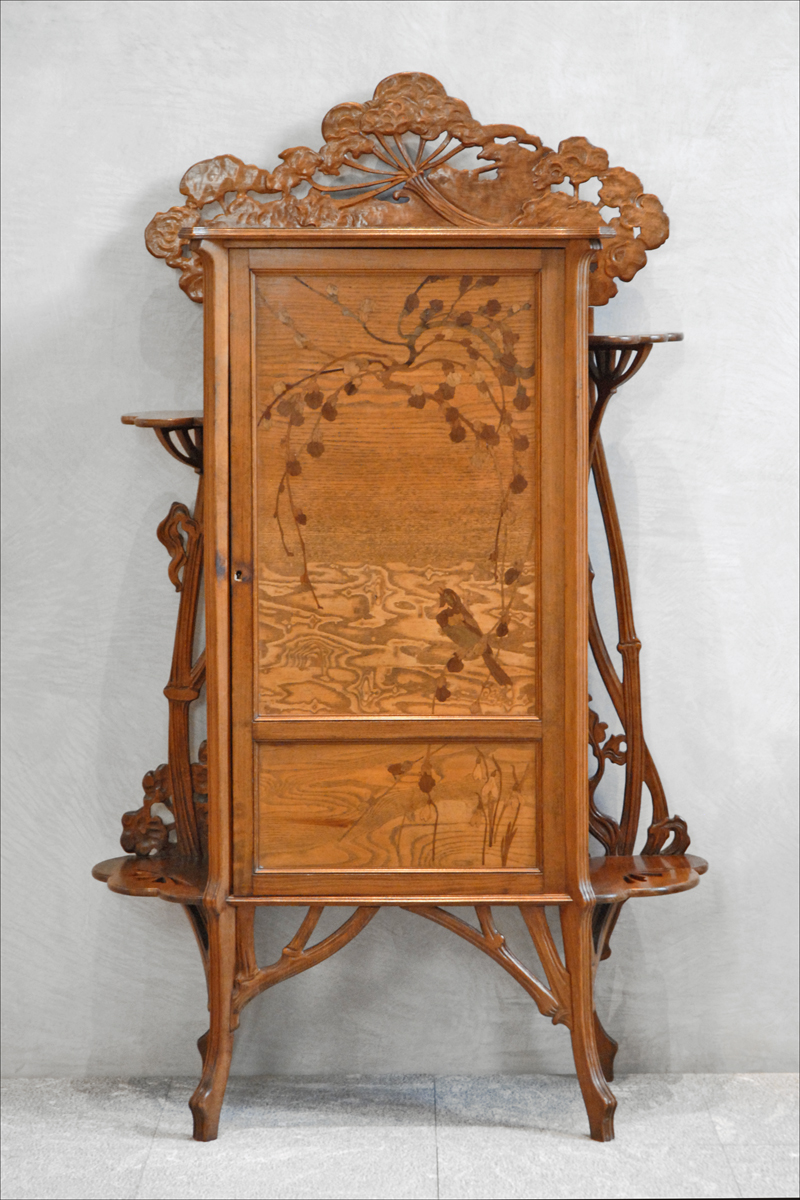
Cabinet called (La Berce des prés) ("Hogweed") (1902) (Musée des Beaux-Arts de Lyon)

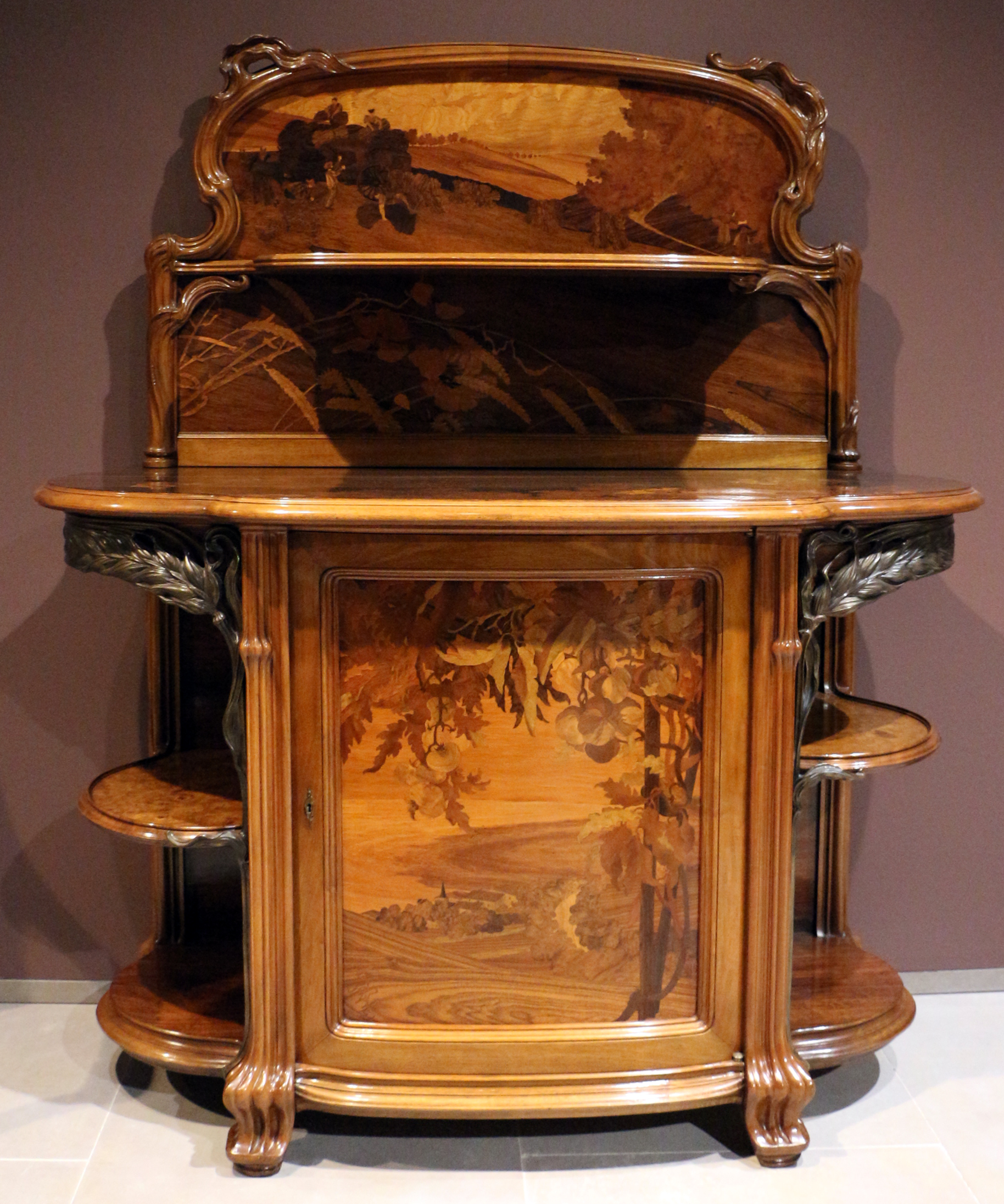
Buffet with marquetry and banana leaf ornament (1900)

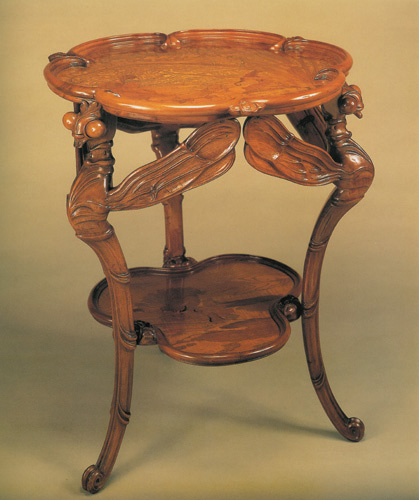
Table with damselfly decoration, walnut wood, marquetry, incrustation of mother-of-pearl (1900) (Museums of Fine Arts of Belgium)

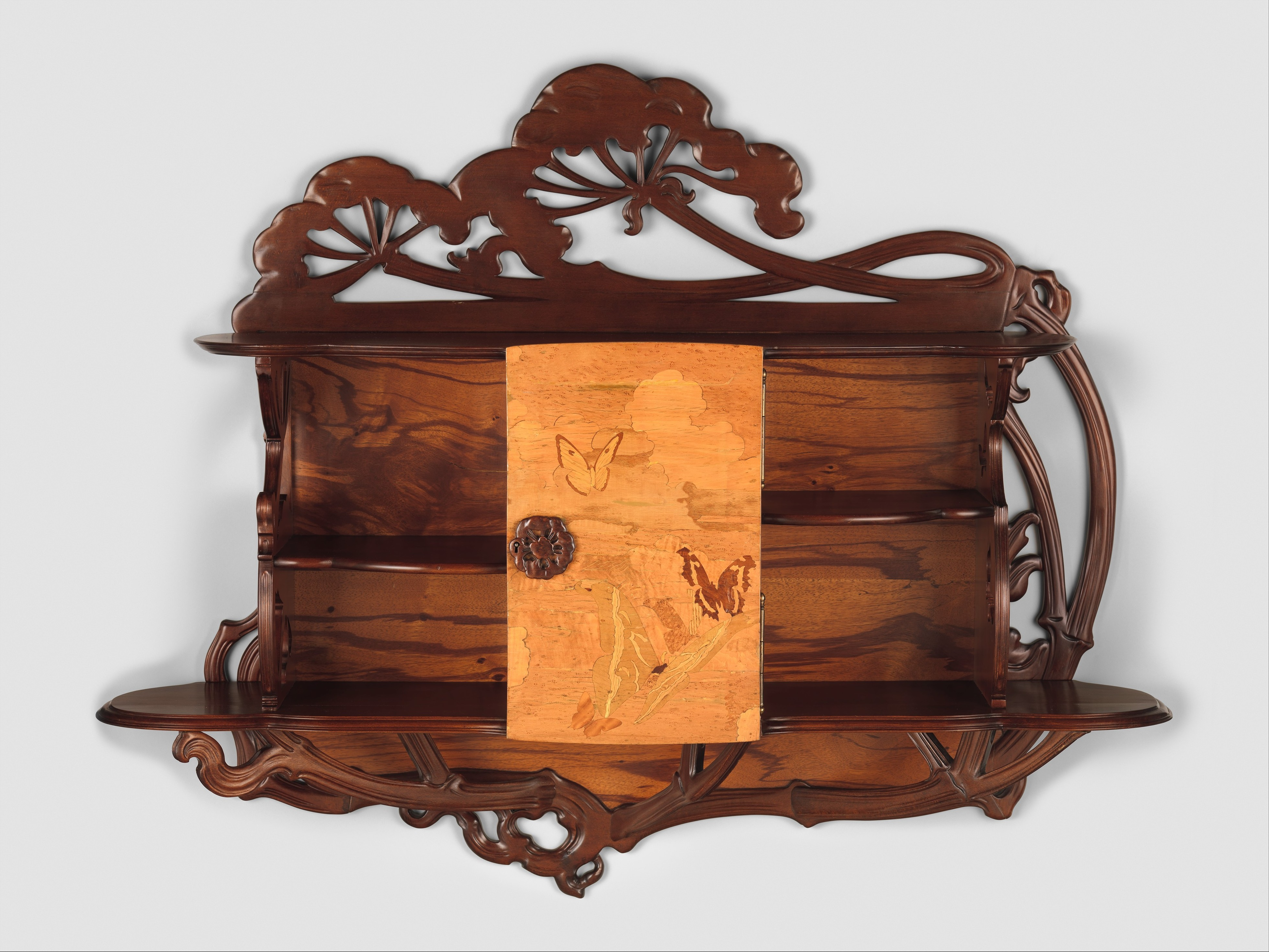
Cabinet with decoration of cow parsley flowers, of birchwood, rosewood, marquetry (1900) (Metropolitan Museum)

== Ceramics and pottery ==
His early ceramics of Gallé were generally plates and vases with more traditional floral designs. The faience, or glazed earthenware of Gallé, rarely achieved the same level of technical quality and fame as his glassware. He largely abandoned it after 1892. However, it contained much of the same imagination and unusual as his glass. His ceramics and glazed earthenware of Gallé oftenl, looked like real earth, employing earthy brown colors, with overlays of leaves and insects

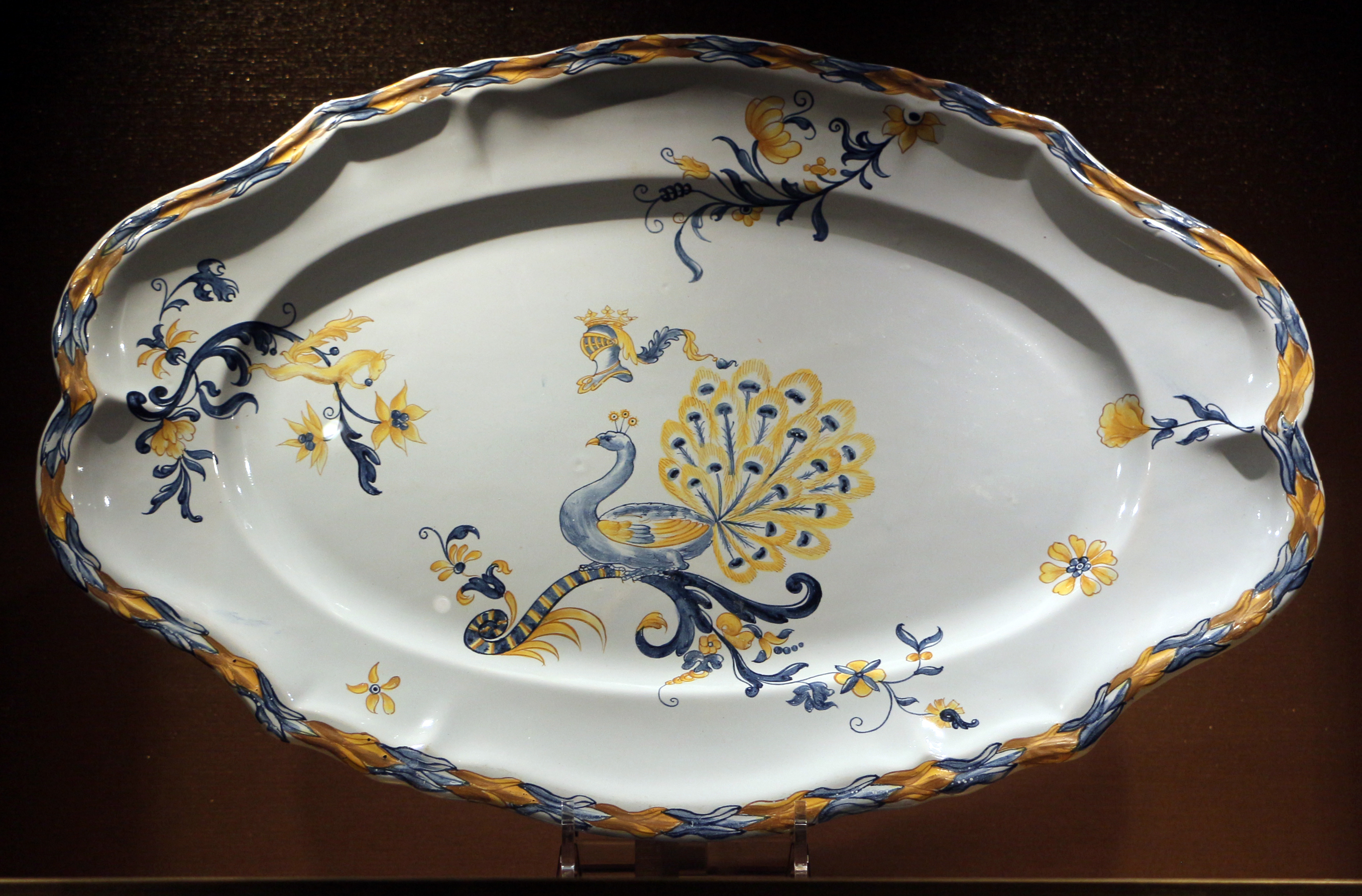
Ceramic plate with peacock (1878)

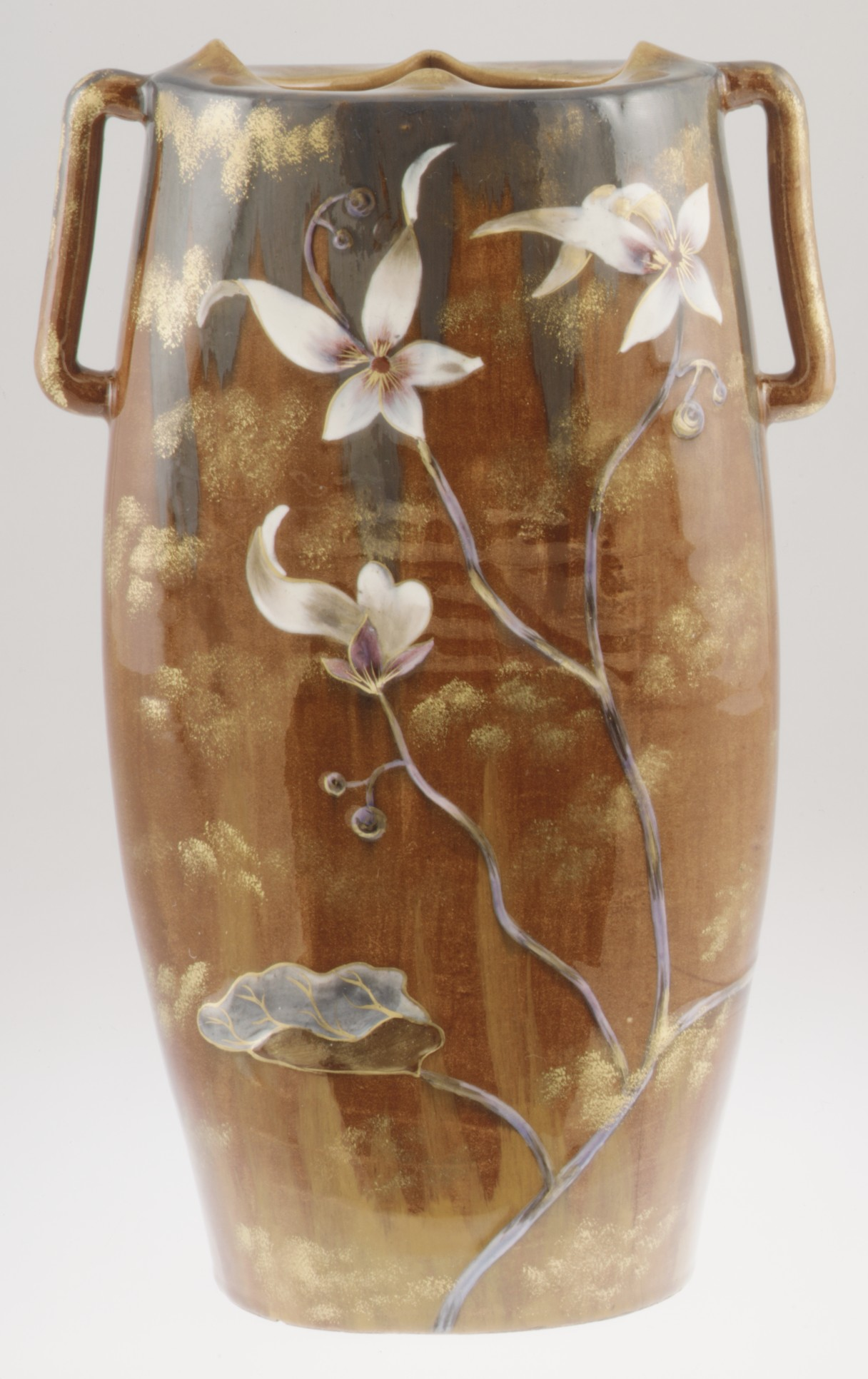
Glazed earthenware vase (Metropolitan Museum) (1885)

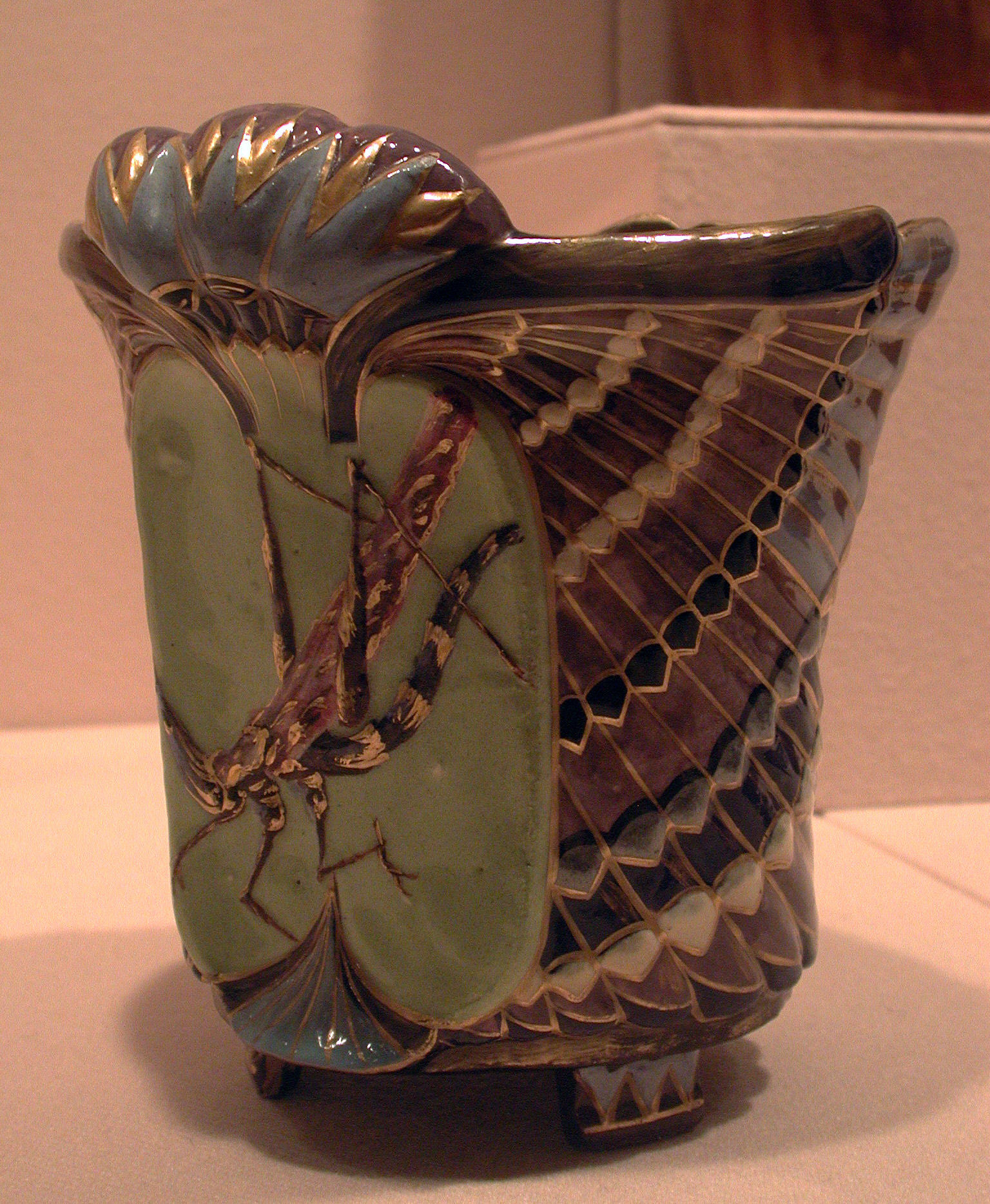
Glazed earthenware vase (1880–1885) (Metropolitan Museum)

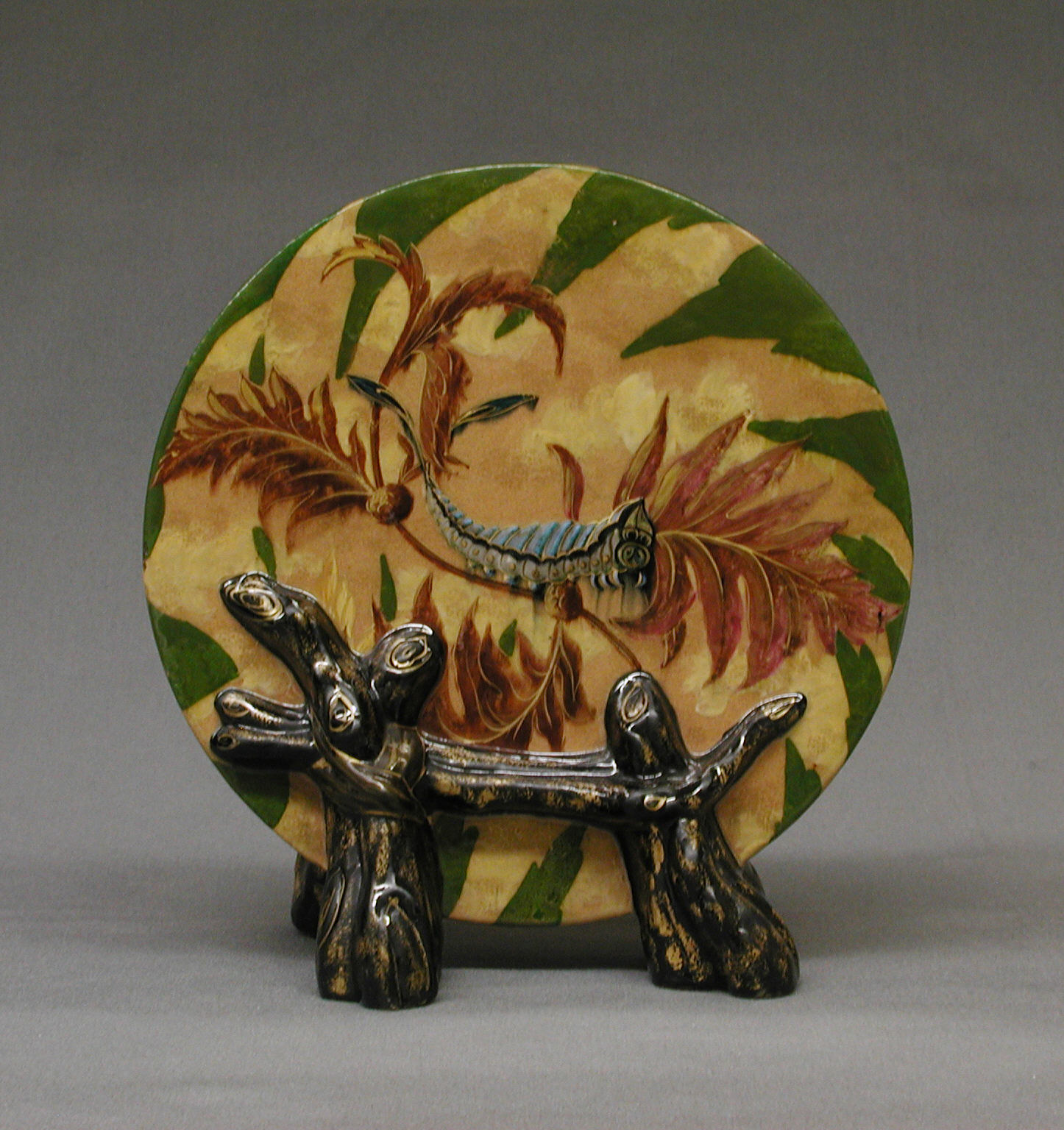
Earthenware vase and sculpted stand (1884) (Metropolitan Museum)

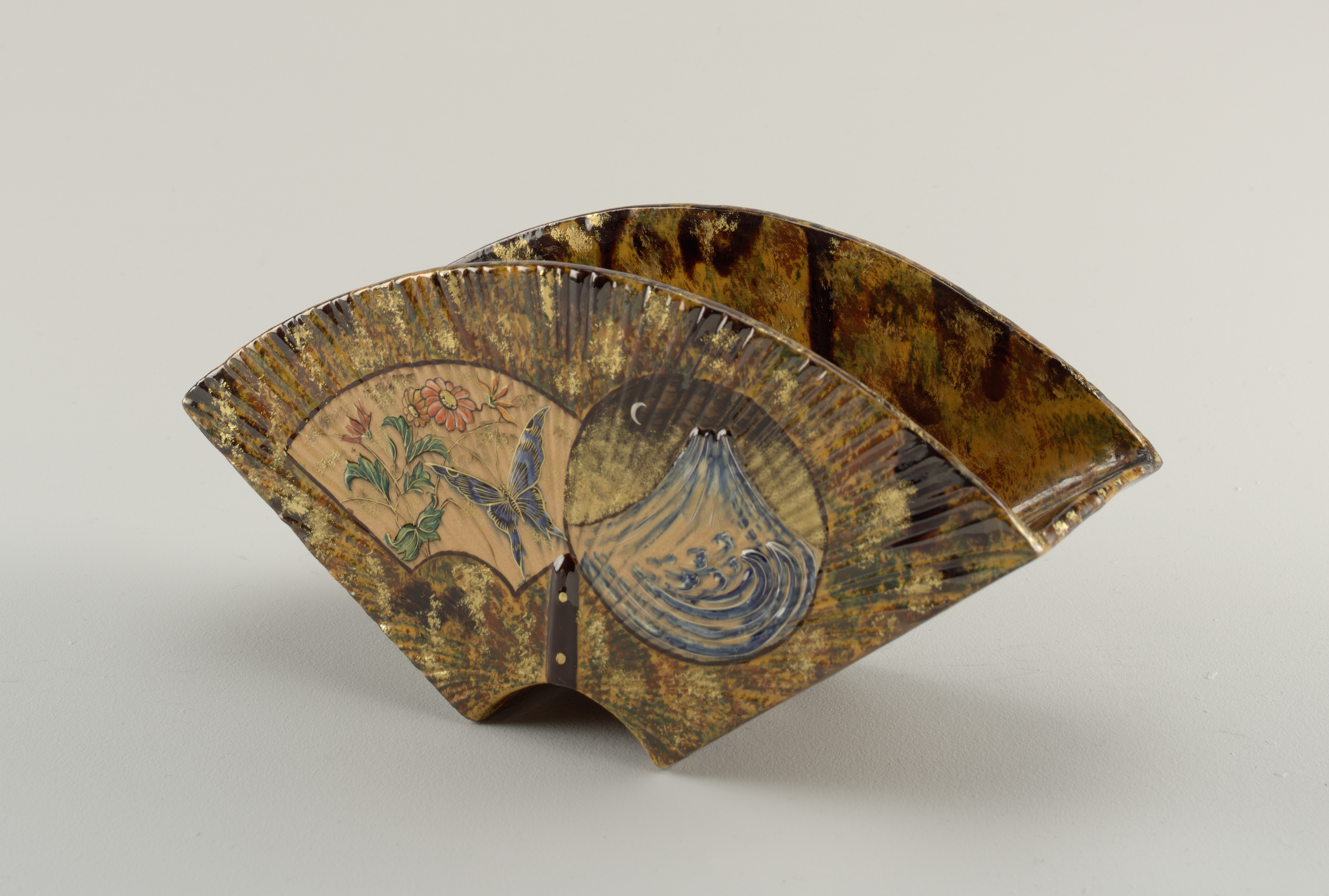
Faience or earthenware vase with two feet, with mountain night scene on the back and a floral daylight scene with butterfly on the front. (1884–1885)

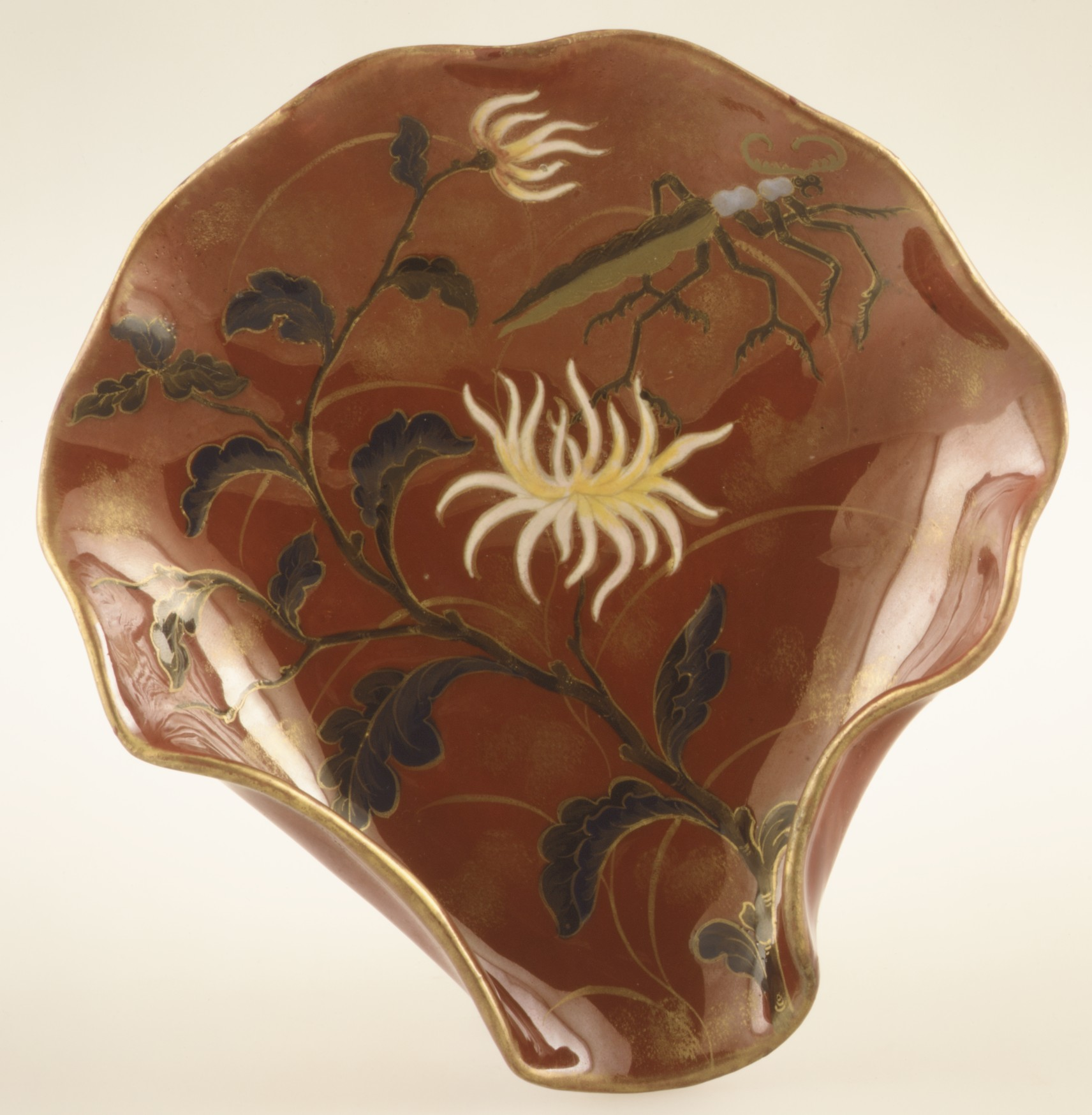
Glazed earthenware dish with floral and insect designs (1885) (Metropolitan Museum)

== See also ==
- Art Nouveau glass

== Bibliography ==
- Bloch-Dermant, Janine (1980). The Art of French Glass (1860–1914). The Vendome Press. ISBN 0-86565-000-4.
- Warmus, William (1984). Emile Gallé: Dreams Into Glass. The Corning Museum of Glass. ISBN 978-08-7290-1094.
- Fahr-Becker, Gabriele (2015). L'Art Nouveau (in French). H.F. Ullmann. ISBN 978-3-8480-0857-5.
- Garner, Philippe (1976). Gallé (in French). Flammarion. ISBN 2-08-012956-2.
- Thomas, Valerie (2009). Le Musée de l'École de Nancy (in French). Somogy. ISBN 978-2-7572-0248-7.
- Sembach, Klaus-Jürgen (2013). L'Art Nouveau- L'Utopie de la Réconciliation (in French). Taschen. ISBN 978-3-8228-3005-5.
