= Hiriart =

Hiriart is a surname. Notable people with the surname include:

- Jhordy Hiriart (fl. 2005), Mexican actor and singer
- Joseph Hiriart (1888–1946), French architect
- Lucía Hiriart (1923–2021), First Lady of Chile and widow of Augusto Pinochet
