= Jeannette Weiss Gruber =

French glass painter (1934–2026)

Jeannette Weiss Gruber (1 July 1934 – 7 June 2026) was a French glass painter.

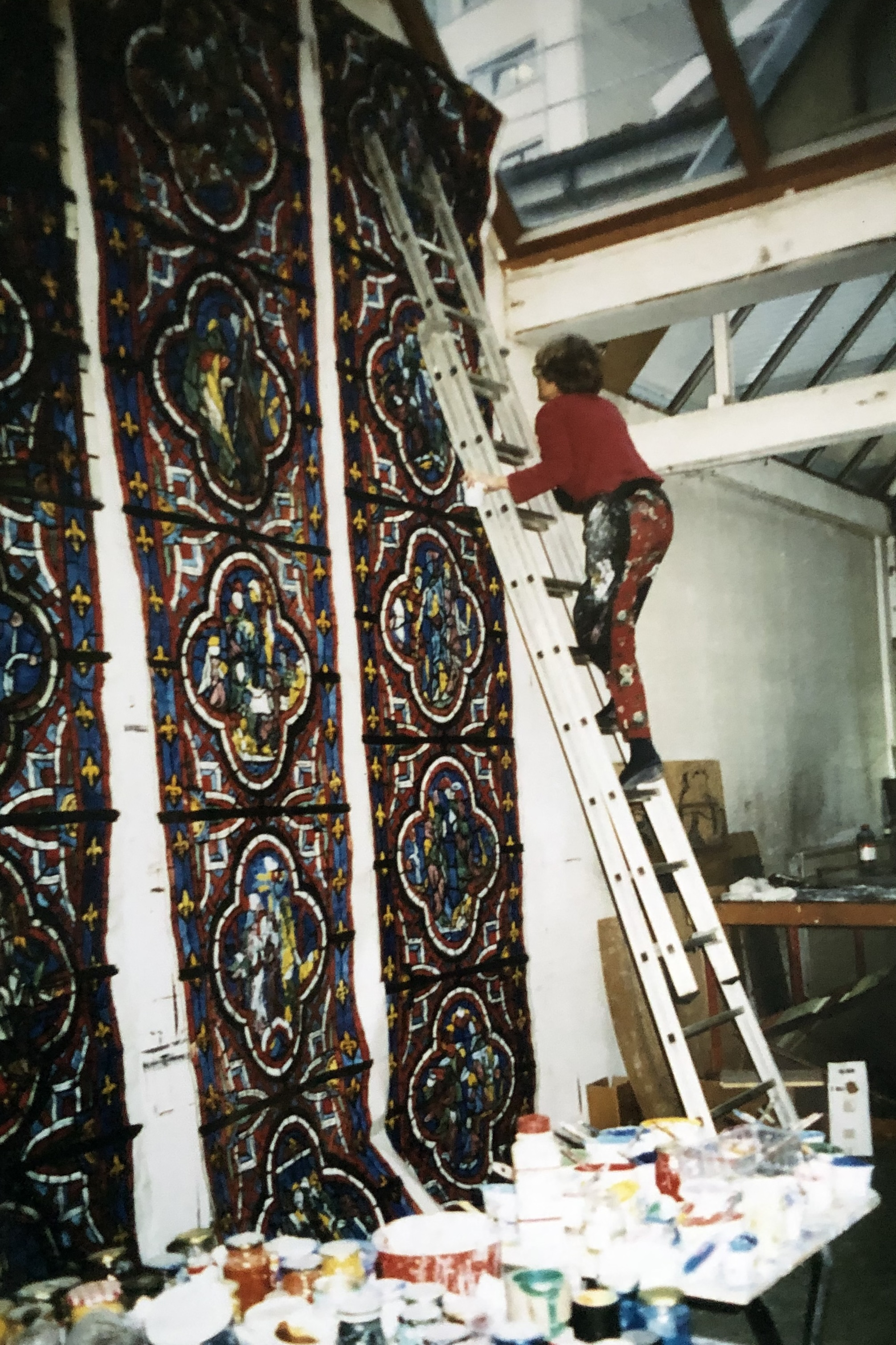
Gruber working on Amiens Cathedral

== Life and career ==
Gruber was born in Paris on 1 July 1934, and was the granddaughter of Jacques Grüber. She began working in her father’s studio in the 1950s before developing her own distinctive style.

Signing her works “JWG,” she became known for integrating contemporary designs with historic architecture, using expressive techniques involving combs, sponges, and brushes while favoring luminous blues and whites. Her commissions include windows for major religious buildings such as the Lyon Cathedral and Amiens Cathedral, as well as numerous churches throughout France.

In recognition of her lifelong contribution to the art of stained glass and architectural restoration, she was awarded the Restoration Medal by the Académie d’Architecture Foundation in 2001.

Gruber died on 7 June 2026, at the age of 91.
