= Villa Bleue =

Historic mansion in Barcelonnette

Coordinates: 44.3865°N 6.6568°E

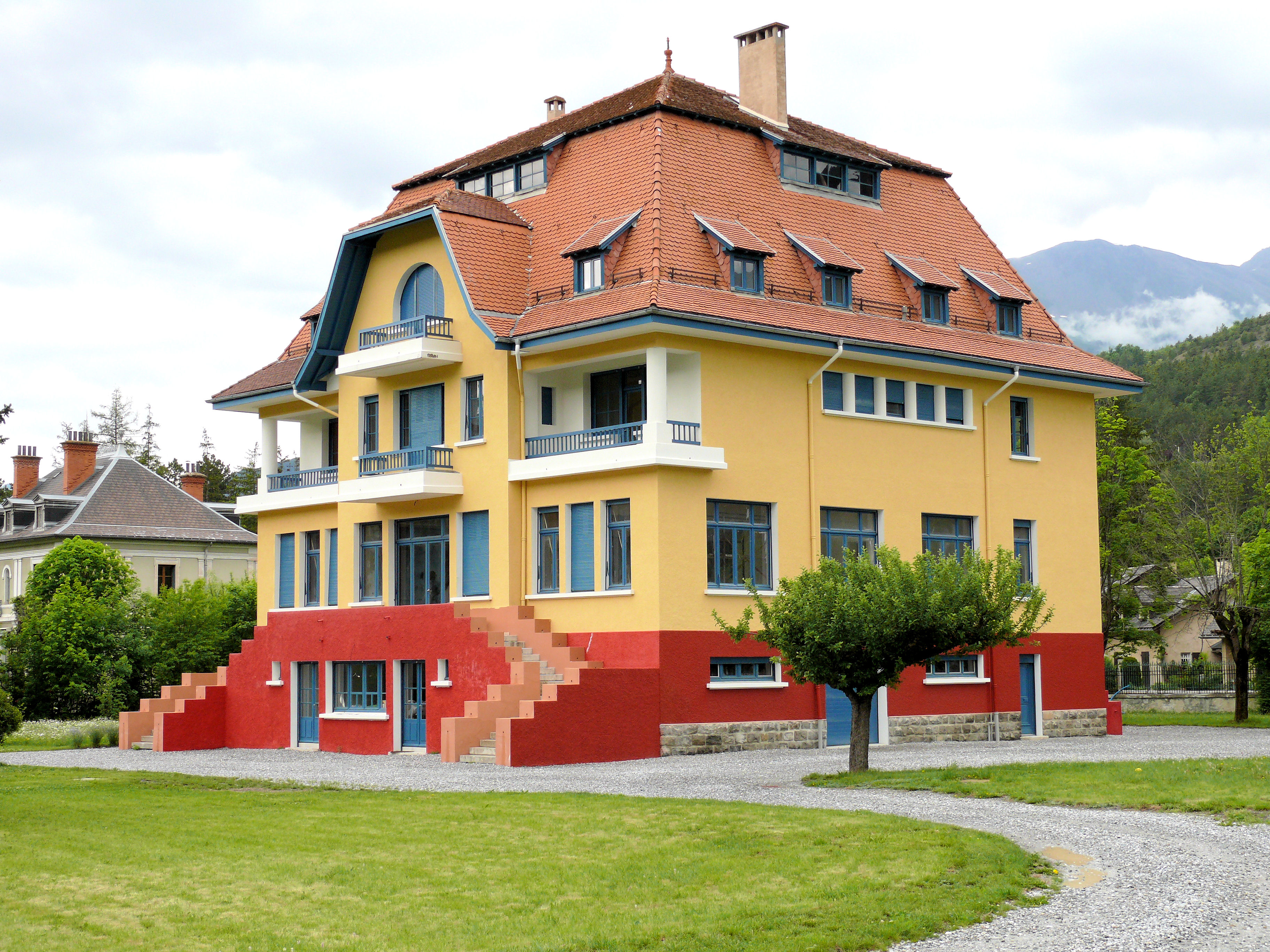
- The Villa Bleue in 2011
- Interactive map of the Villa Bleue area
- Alternative names: Blue Villa

General information
- Type: Mansion
- Architectural style: Art Deco
- Location: 1 avenue Porfirio-Diaz and avenue de Berwick, Barcelonnette, France
- Construction started: 1929
- Completed: 1931
- Client: Camille Jean

Technical details
- Floor count: 5

Design and construction
- Architects: Joseph Hiriart; Georges Tribout; Georges Beau

The Villa Bleue (Blue Villa) is a historic mansion in Barcelonnette, Alpes-de-Haute-Provence, Provence-Alpes-Côte d'Azur, France.

It was built from 1929 to 1931 for Camille Jean, a French businessman who founded Francia Maritima, a store in Mexico City, Mexico. It was designed in Art Deco style by Joseph Hiriart, Georges Tribout and Georges Beau. Jacques Grüber crafted the glassworks. It has been listed as an official historical monument since 1987.
