= École de Nancy =

Art movement based in Nancy, France (1890–1914)

École de Nancy (School of Nancy)
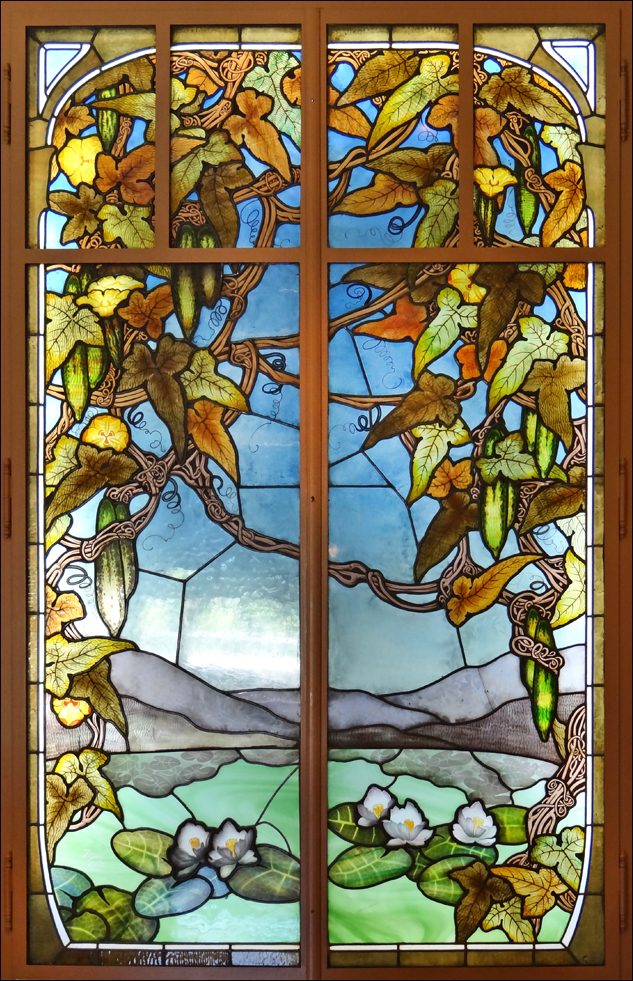
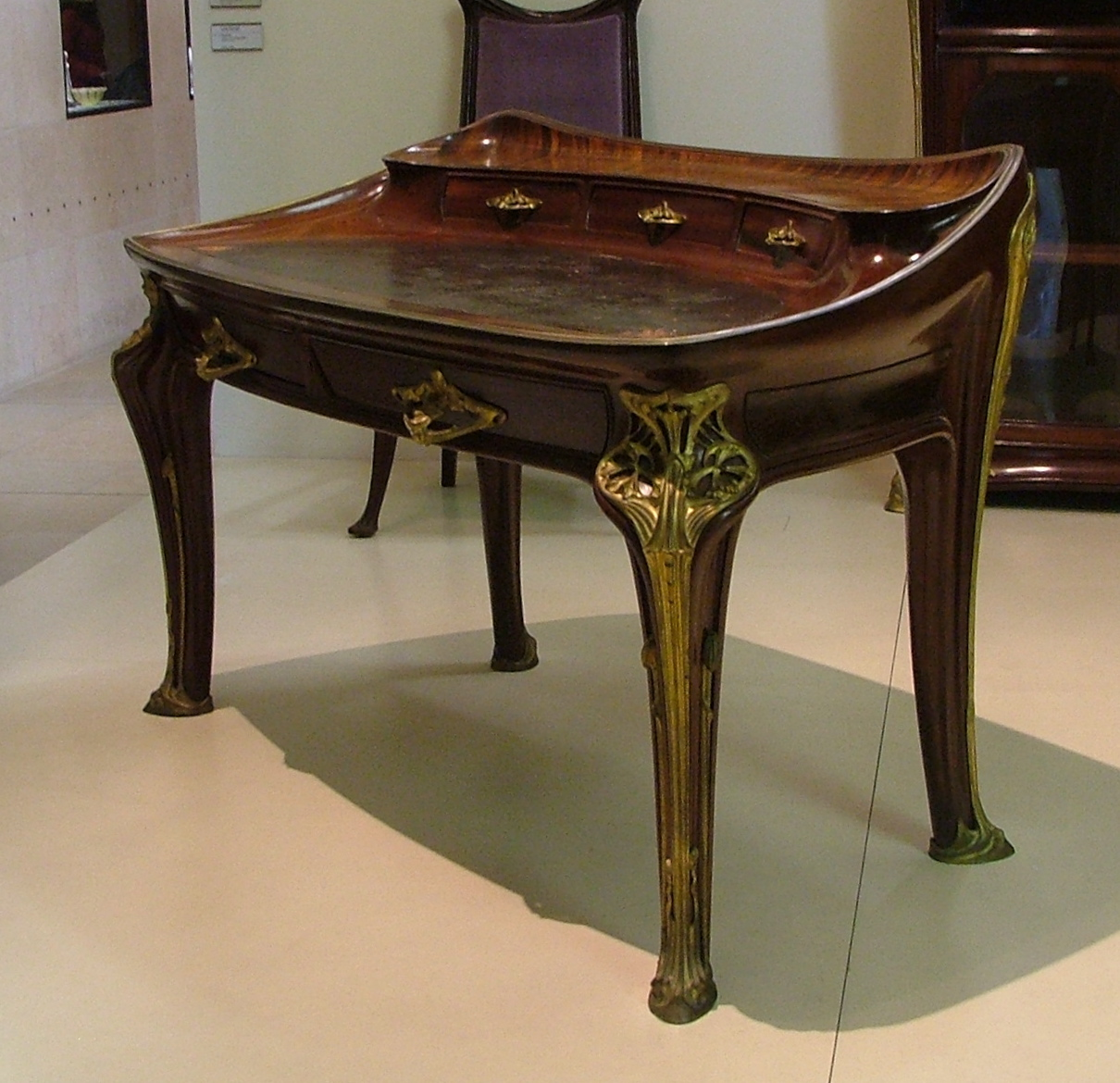
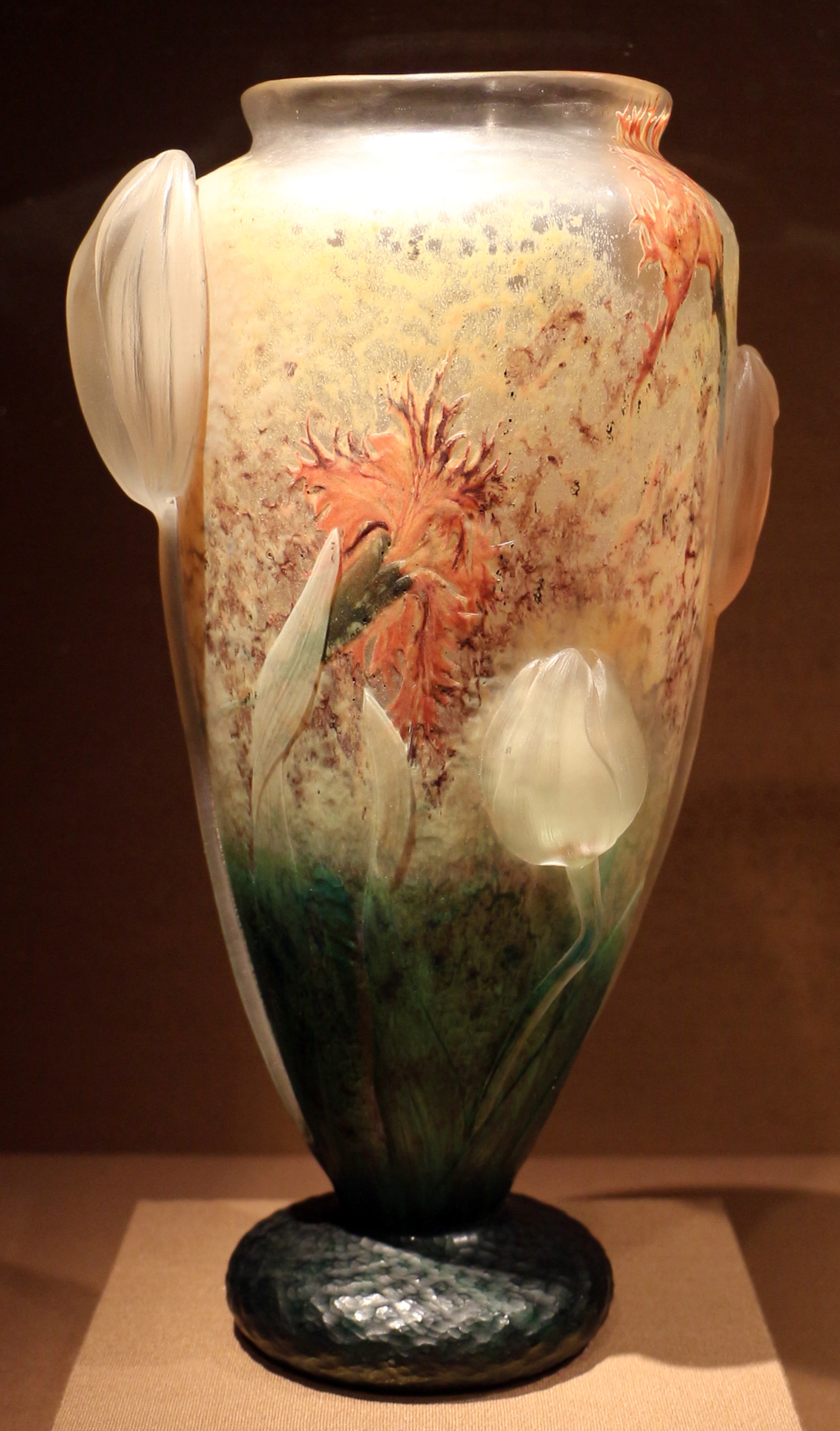
- Top: Window by Jacques Grüber; Center: Desk by Louis Majorelle Bottom: Tulip vase by Antonin Daum
- Years active: 1890-1914
- Location: France

École de Nancy, or the Nancy School, was a group of Art Nouveau artisans and designers working in Nancy, France between 1890 and 1914. Major figures included the furniture designer Louis Majorelle, ebonist and glass artist Jacques Grüber, the glass and furniture designer Émile Gallé, and the crystal manufactory of Daum. Their work was largely inspired by floral and vegetal forms found in the region. The goal of the group was to produce in series ordinary objects, such as furniture, glassware, and pottery, with fine craftsmanship and in original forms, making art objects available for people's homes.

== History ==
The Nancy School emerged from dramatic events in the history of Lorraine, which had become a province of France in 1776. After the French defeat in the Franco-Prussian War in 1870, neighboring Alsace and a large part of Lorraine were ceded to the German Empire, but Nancy remained inside France. The division resulted in a large exodus of French artists, artisans, teachers, and businessmen from German-occupied Lorraine to Nancy. The population of Nancy grew to 100,000, making it the largest city in Eastern France, and the city became the economic, political, and cultural center of the region. It became a center for the manufacture of textiles, leather, beer, glass, and ceramics. Because of its strategic importance near the German frontier, it also had excellent transportation connections to Paris and the rest of France.

The Nancy School was formally organized in 1901 by a group of young craftsmen in the city. It had existed informally since 1894, when a group of artists participated in the new Lorraine Society of Decorative Arts. The new group was led by Émile Gallé. The group participated with great success in the Paris Universal Exposition of 1900. Gallé particularly urged artists to return to nature as their principal source of inspiration.

The formal goals of the School, published on February 13, 1901, declared that it was "A provincial alliance of the industries of art". It was to organize expositions and artists' workshops, to encourage the reform of artistic education, and to adapt the arts to industrial methods of production. The manifesto of the school declared that utility should be the chief requirement of the work created, and that they should be designed, as much as possible, after the natural flora of Lorraine, especially ginkgo, pennywort, giant hogweed, water lily, thistle, gourd, and creatures such as dragonflies. The members of the founding committee were Émile Gallé, Louis Majorelle, Jean-Antonin Daum, and ebeniste and furniture designer Eugène Vallin.

== Glassware and crystal ==
Glassware and crystal were arts for which Nancy became particularly known. The glassmaker Jean Daum emigrated to France in 1878 and started his own studio, Daum Glass, which was inherited by his two sons, Antonin Daum and his brother Auguste Daum. They guided the company into Art Nouveau. The Daum brothers expressed their goal at the end of the 1880s: "to apply in an industrial way the true principles of decorative art."

Their method was to produce objects in series, as well as one-of-a-kind items, and they adapted well to the new technology of electric light bulbs. The vases and lamps usually had very simple designs taken from plants or vegetables, with monochrome or richly varied colors of many different layers of glass within the lamp.

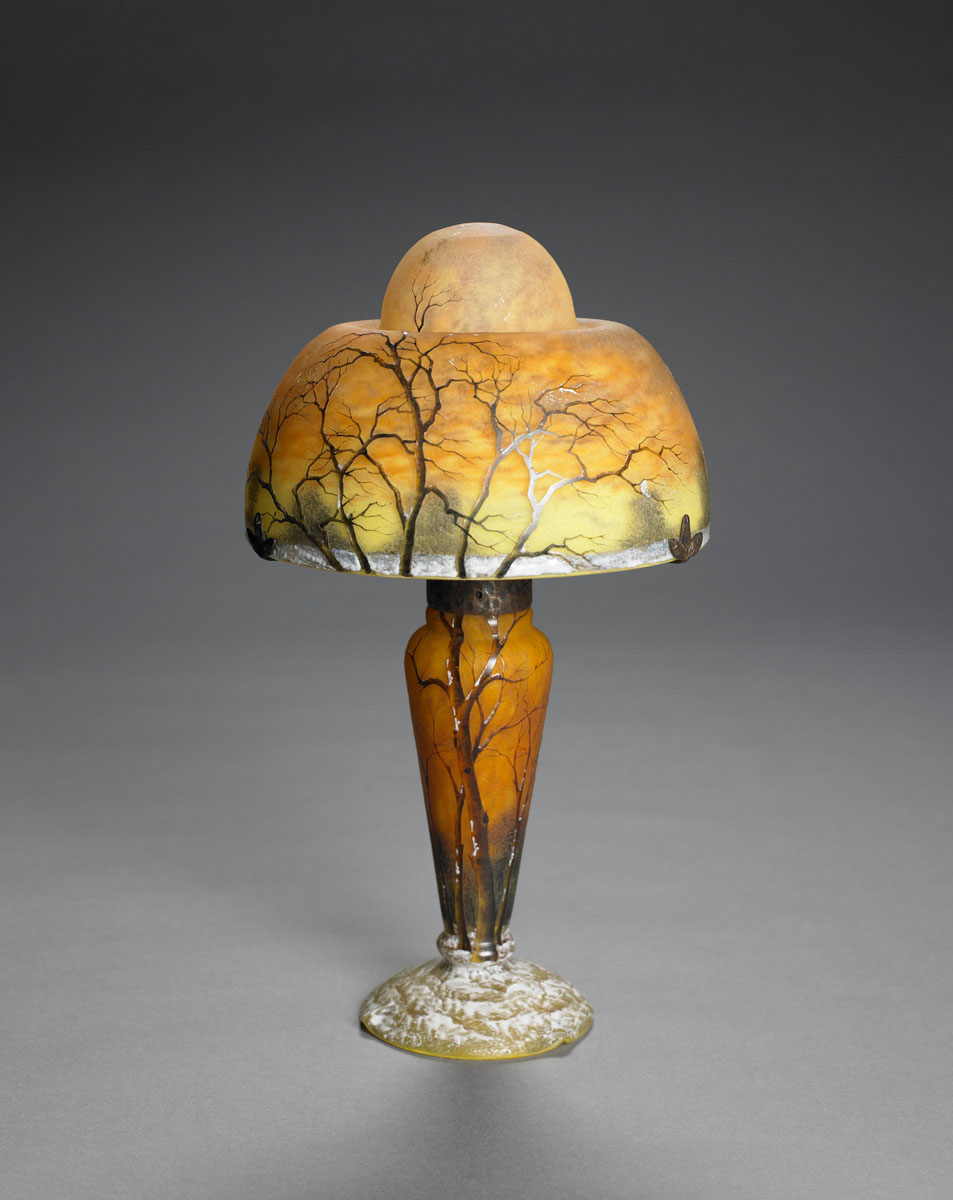
Daum lamp with trees and fallen snow (c. 1900)

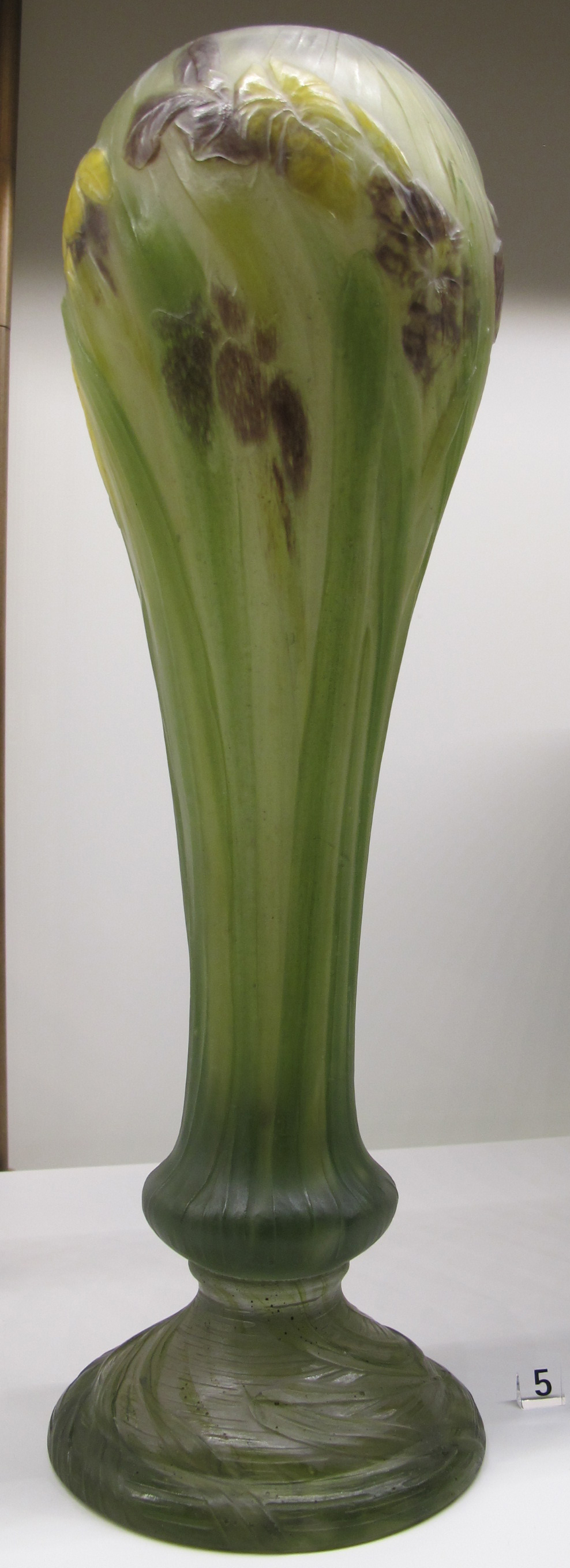
Daum crystal vase with iris flowers (c. 1900)

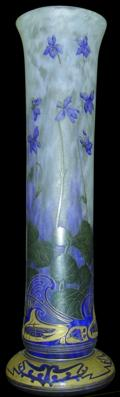
Daum vase with cricket design (1900)

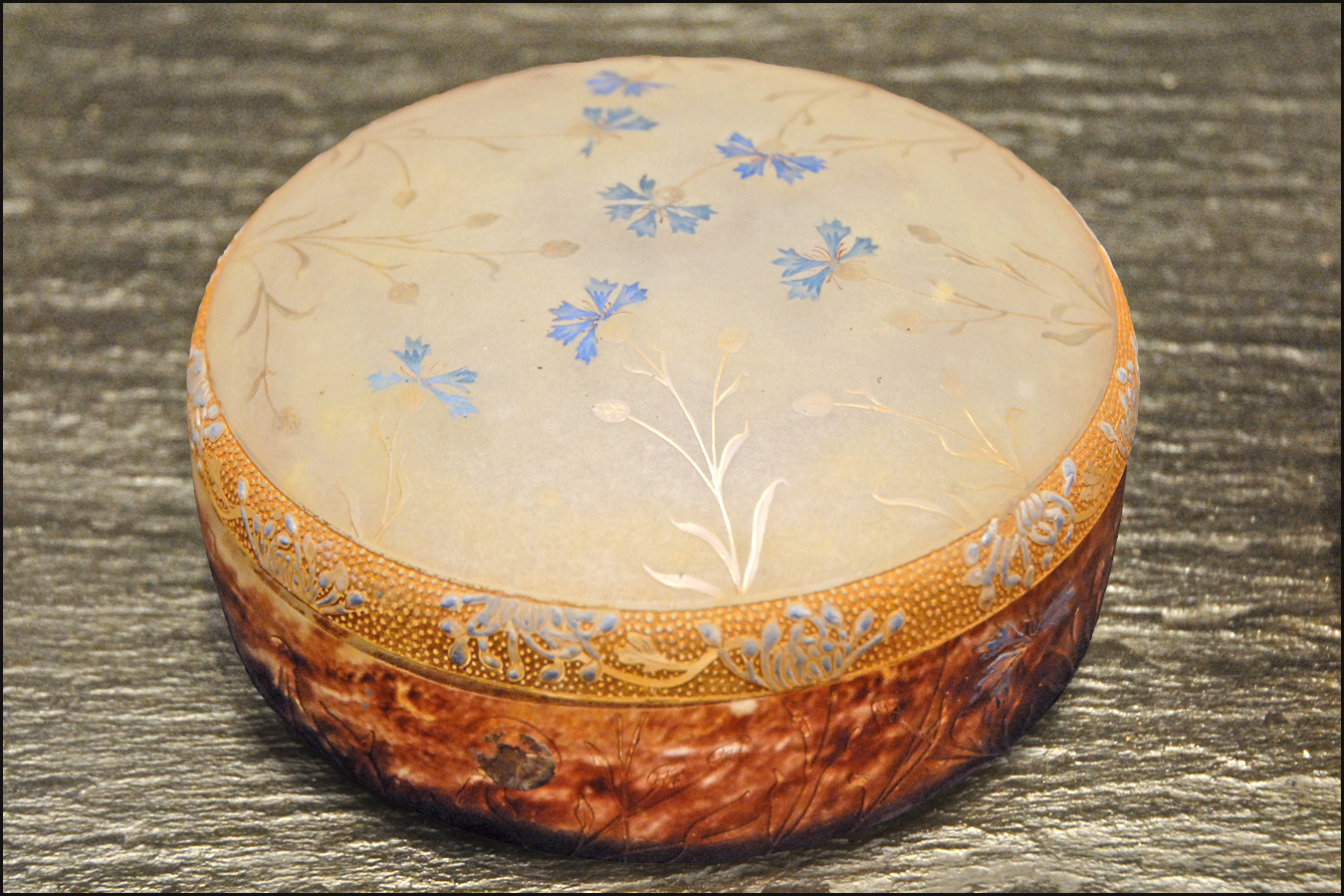
Daum Bonbon container with cornflower design of engraved glass, enamel, and gold by Daum (1901)

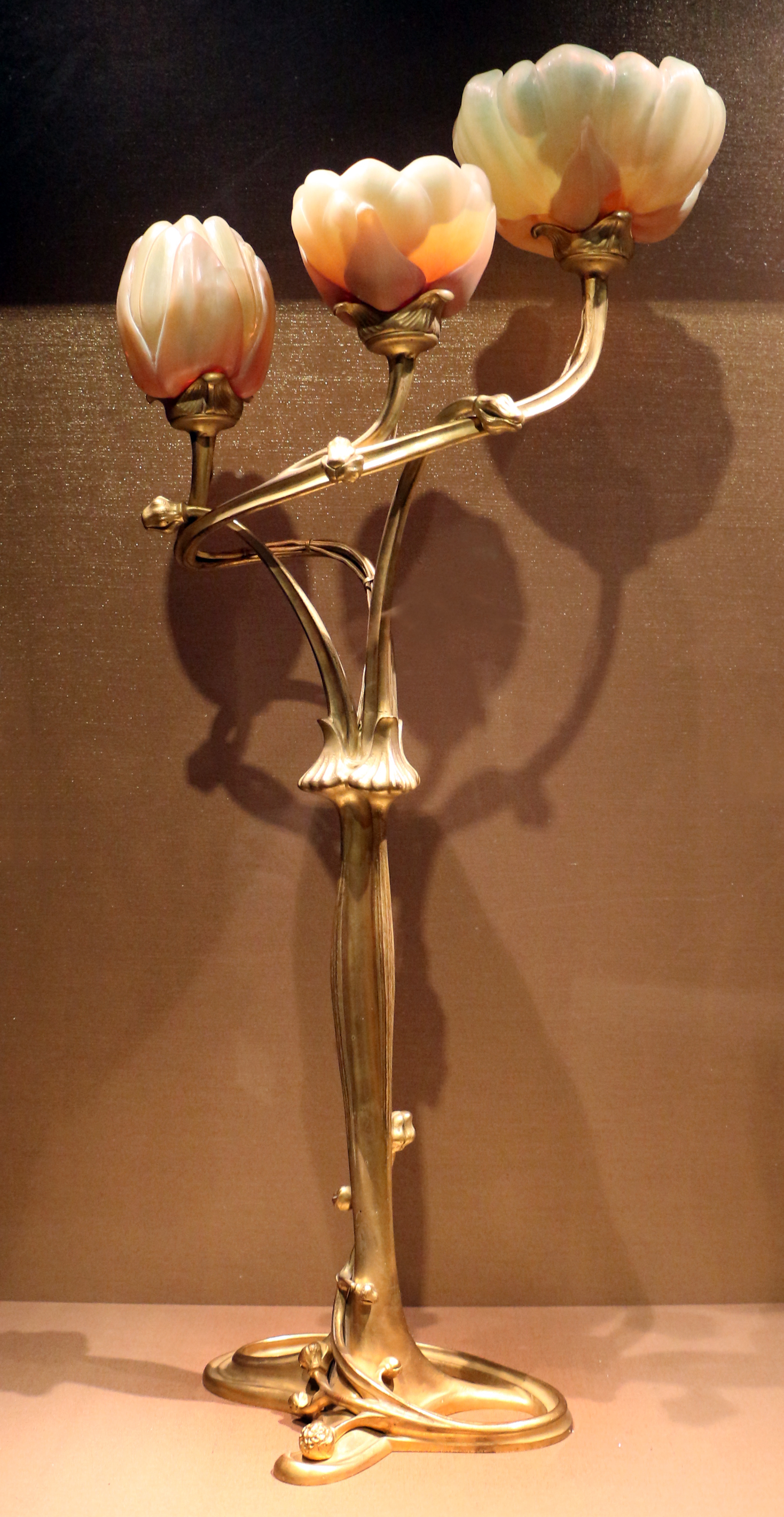
Daum lamp with Magnolia flowers, designed with Louis Majorelle (1903)

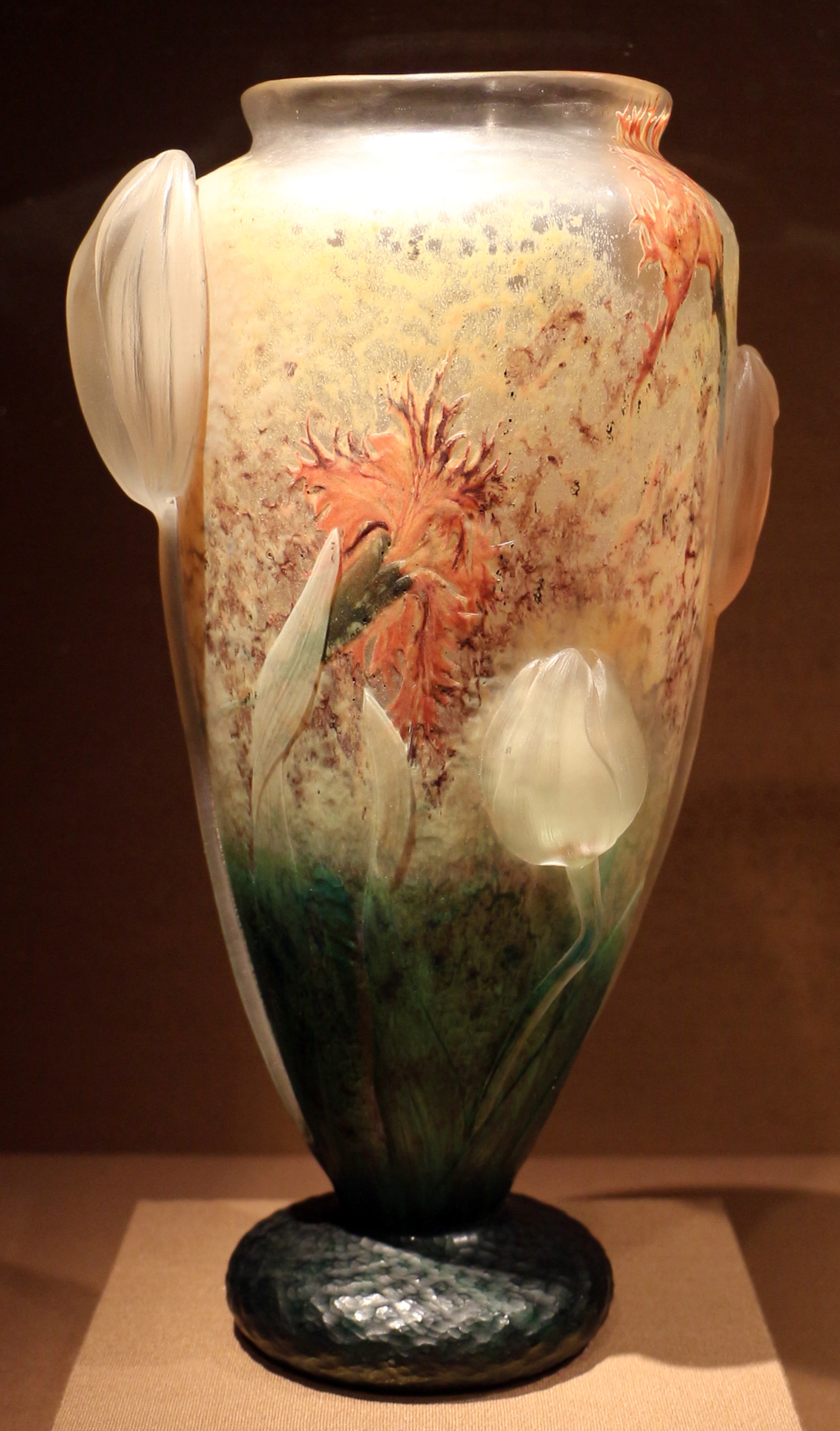
Tulip vase by Antonin Daum (1910)

The other major figure in glass art in Nancy was Émile Gallé. The work of Gallé was greatly varied, with a rich assortment of colors, designs, and materials, including glass, ceramics, crystal, porcelain, and faience. He experimented with different materials and a technique known as glass marqueterie, introducing into the hot glass pieces of different colored glass, powdered glass, metal, or gold. He was also very interested in Japanese art, borrowing techniques which he used to accomplish his own goals. The critic Henri Franz wrote of Gallé in 1897, that while he used Japanese techniques, "nothing is farther from Japanese art. He only borrowed the expressions of Japanese art and remade them with skill and taste. Nature offered him an inexhaustible source of inspiration... When Gallé represented a plant, his immense artistic sensibility reduced it to its essence."

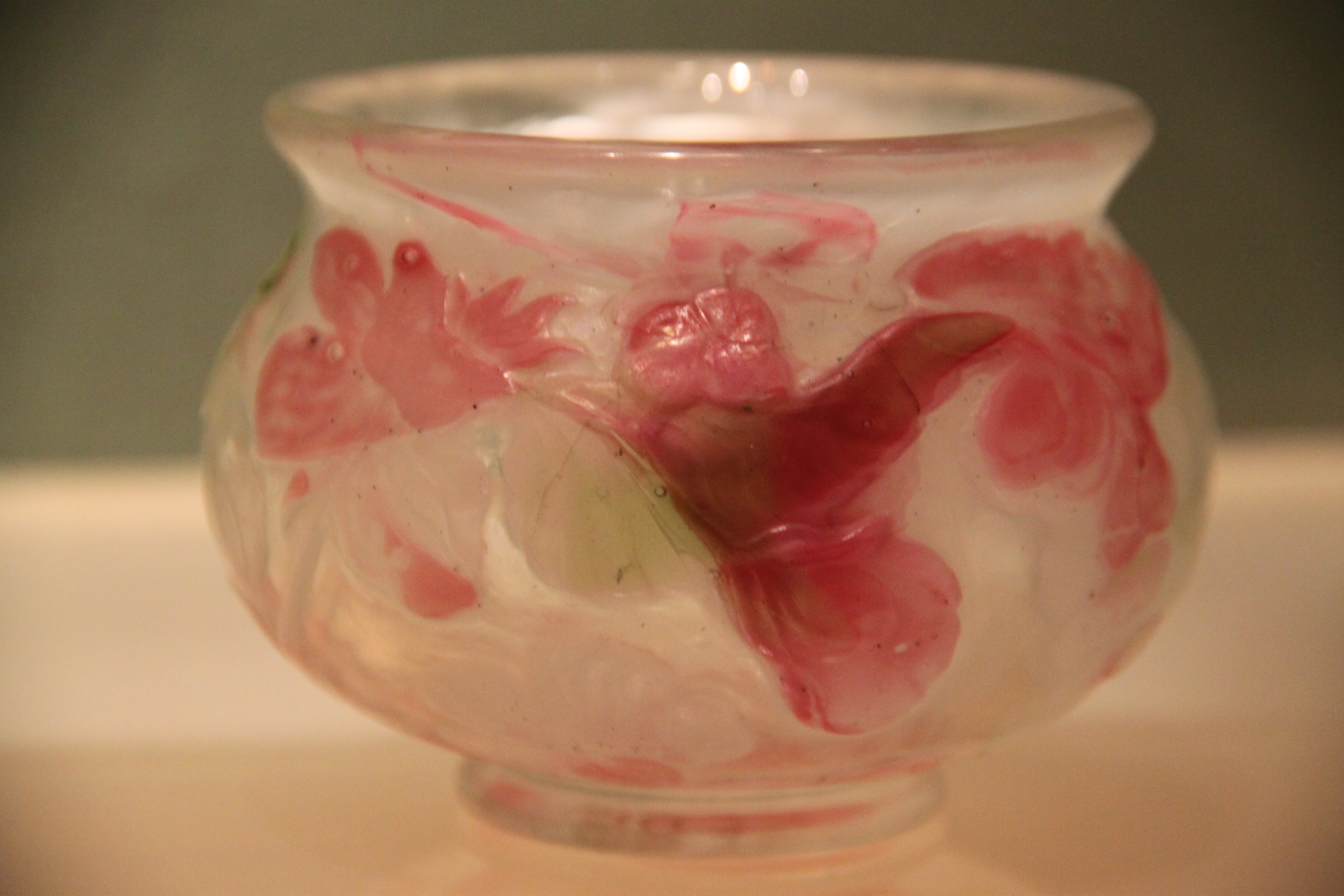
Begonia Rose cup by Émile Gallé (1894)

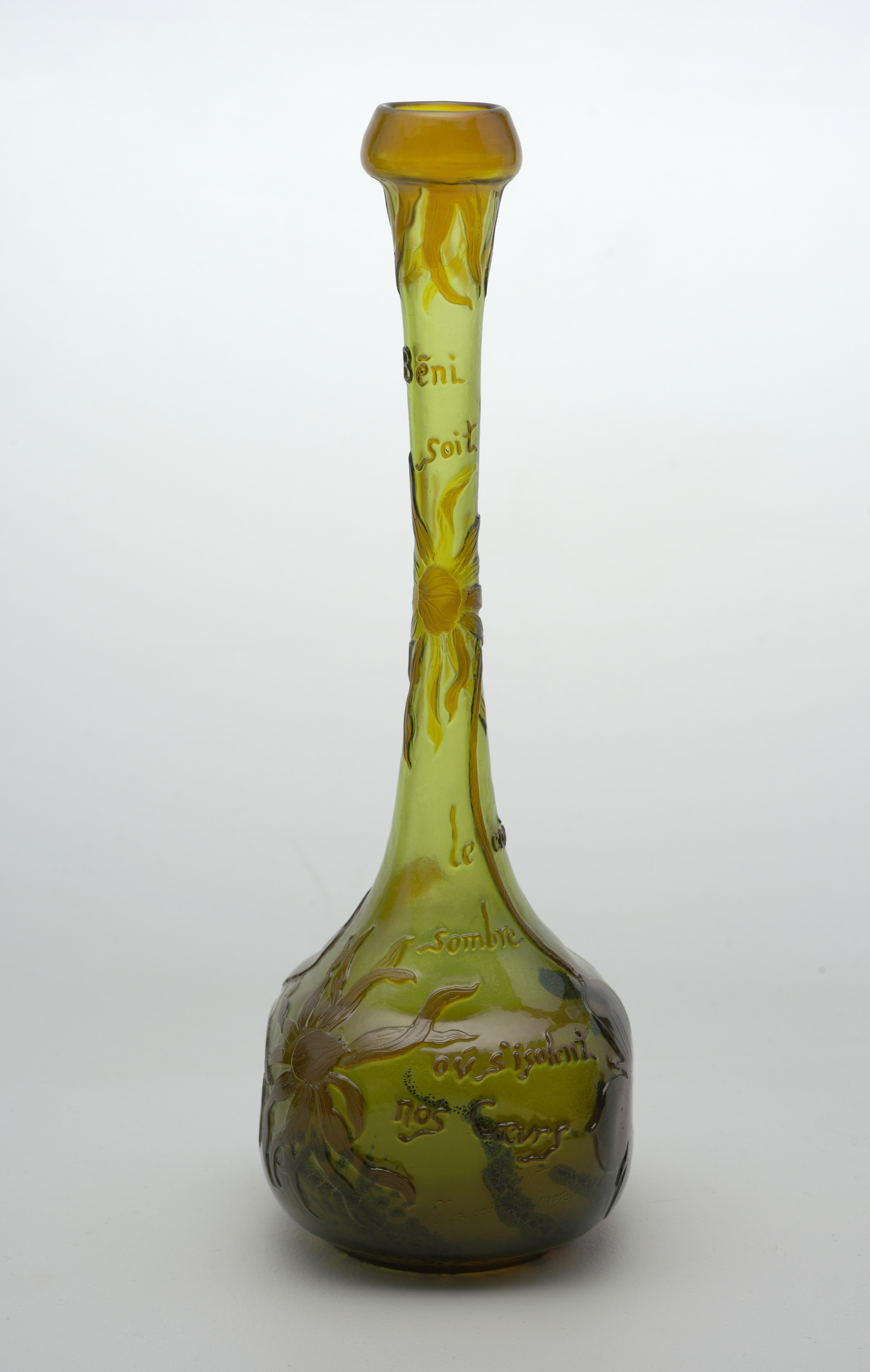
Bud vase by Émile Gallé (1900)

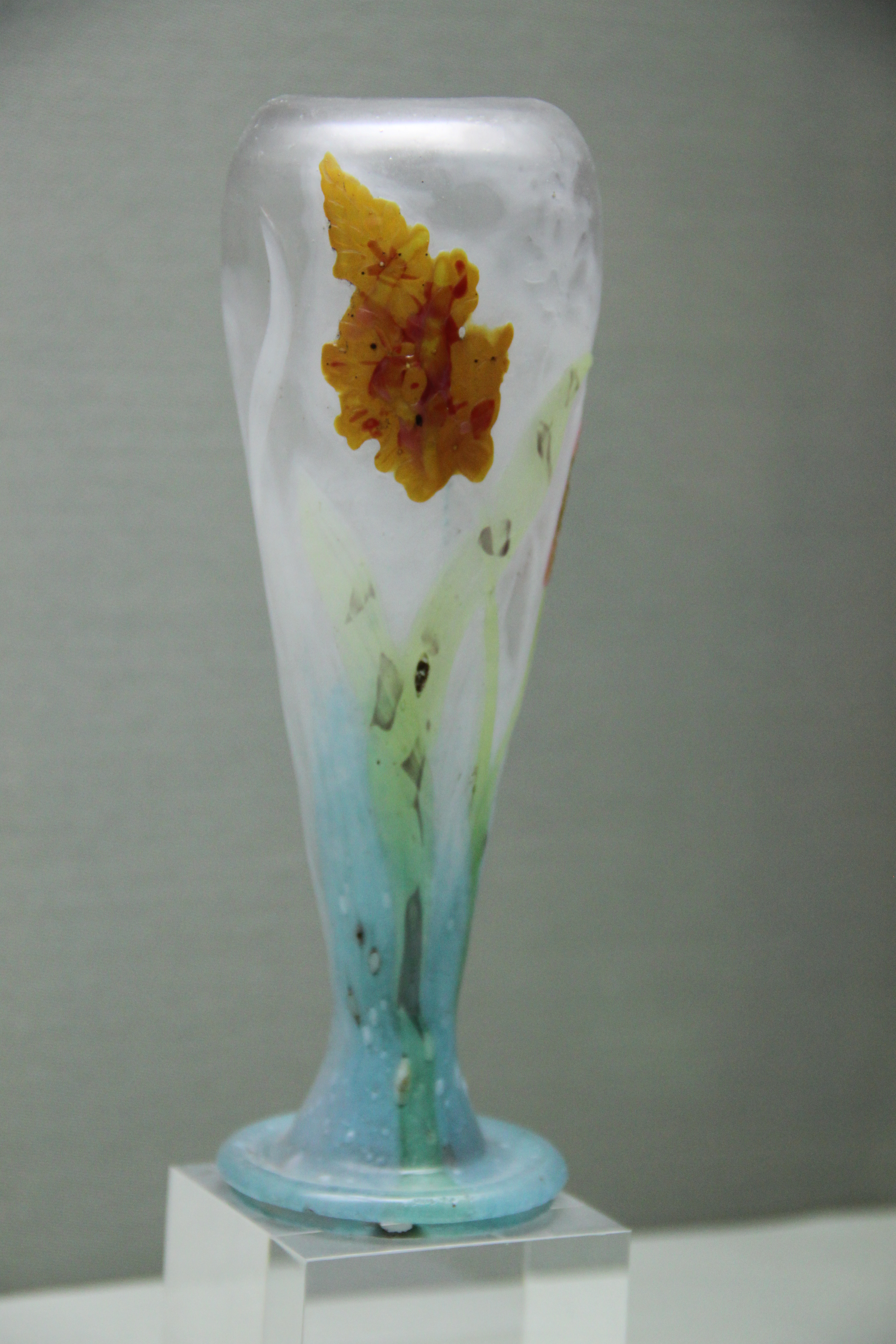
Orchid vase by Émile Gallé (1897)

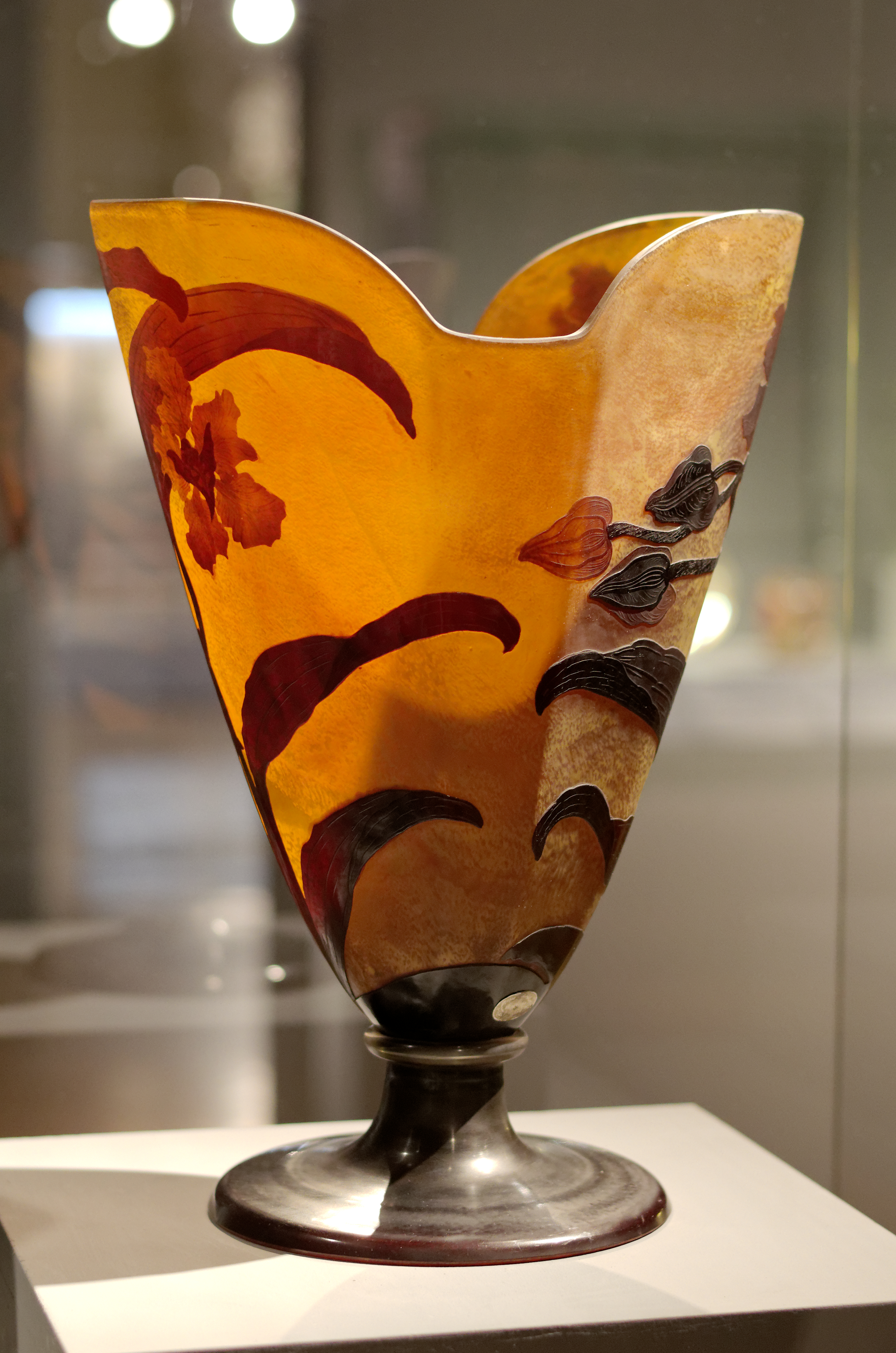
Orchid branch vase by Émile Gallé (1900)

== Furniture ==
Furniture design and manufacture was another important art and industry in Nancy. The city had a large number of skilled artisans, many coming from German-occupied Alsace. The furniture designers worked closely with artists in other crafts, such as glassware and textiles.

The most important figure in the furniture of Nancy was Louis Majorelle. At the age of twenty, with the death of his father, though he had planned to be a painter and artist, he took over the family business making furniture and ceramics. He was strongly influenced by the ideas of Émile Gallé and was a founding member of the Nancy School. With the ideas of the school in mind, he oriented the furniture produced by his company away from traditional designs and toward the Art Nouveau.

In the 1890s many of the Majorelle works were designed by his collaborators, Jacques Grüber and Camille Gauthier. Majorelle often worked in collaboration with the Nancy glass designer Émile Gallé. In 1898 a prominent Nancy architect, Lucien Weissemburger, joined his firm. More and more, however, he made his own designs. He designed not only woodwork, but also the fittings and decoration in bronze and other metals, and also made decorative ironwork. His ironwork creations included the elegant Art Nouveau stairway railing of the Galeries Lafayette Department Store in Paris (1900).

His work had great success at the Paris Universal Exposition of 1900. During this period, he presented finely crafted furniture made of dark walnut, mahogany, snakewood, and hazel wood contrasting with the gilded bronze and hammered copper ornaments inspired by natural forms, such as water lilies. His water lily bed (1902–03), now in the Musée d'Orsay in Paris, is a classic example of this style. Another is the Orchid Desk (1903–05), made of snakewood, ornamented with sculpted and chiseled bronze and copper.

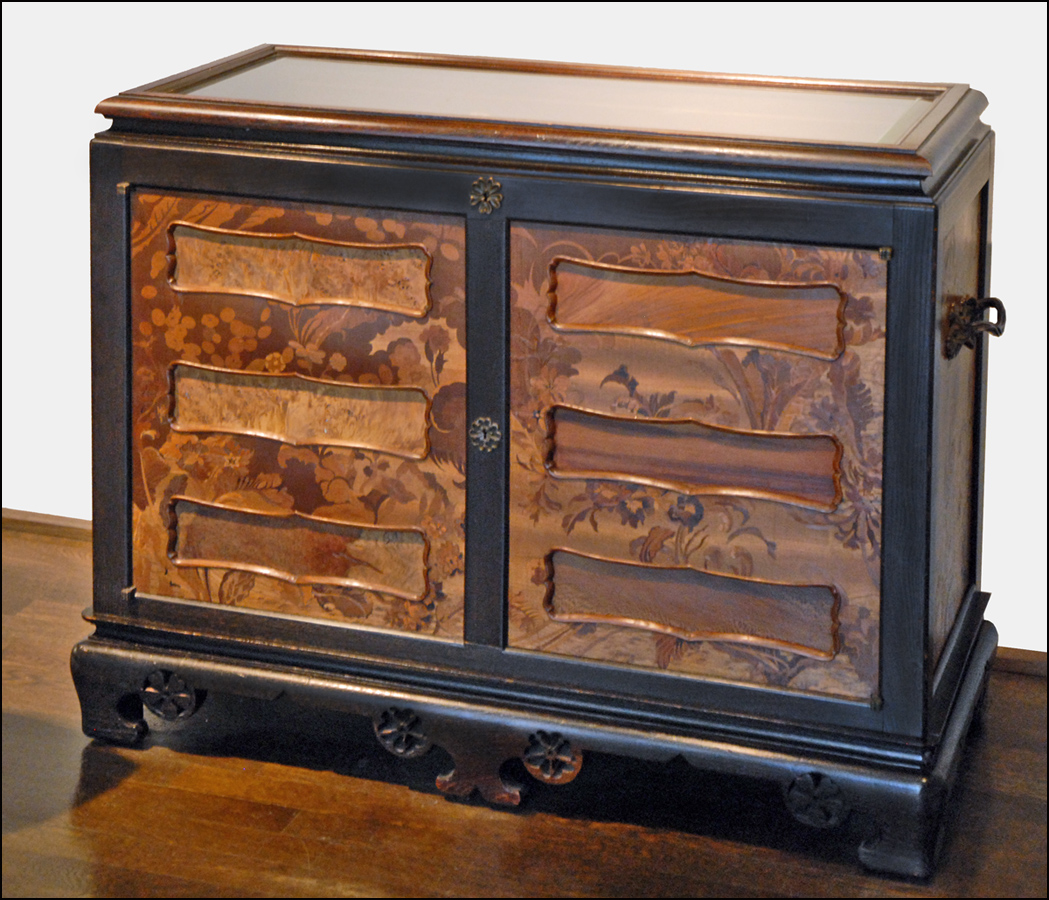
Cabinet of ash wood, oak and poplar, with marquetry of colored woods and sculpted bronze, by Émile Gallé presented at the 1900 Paris Exposition (1900), Musée des Arts Décoratifs, Paris

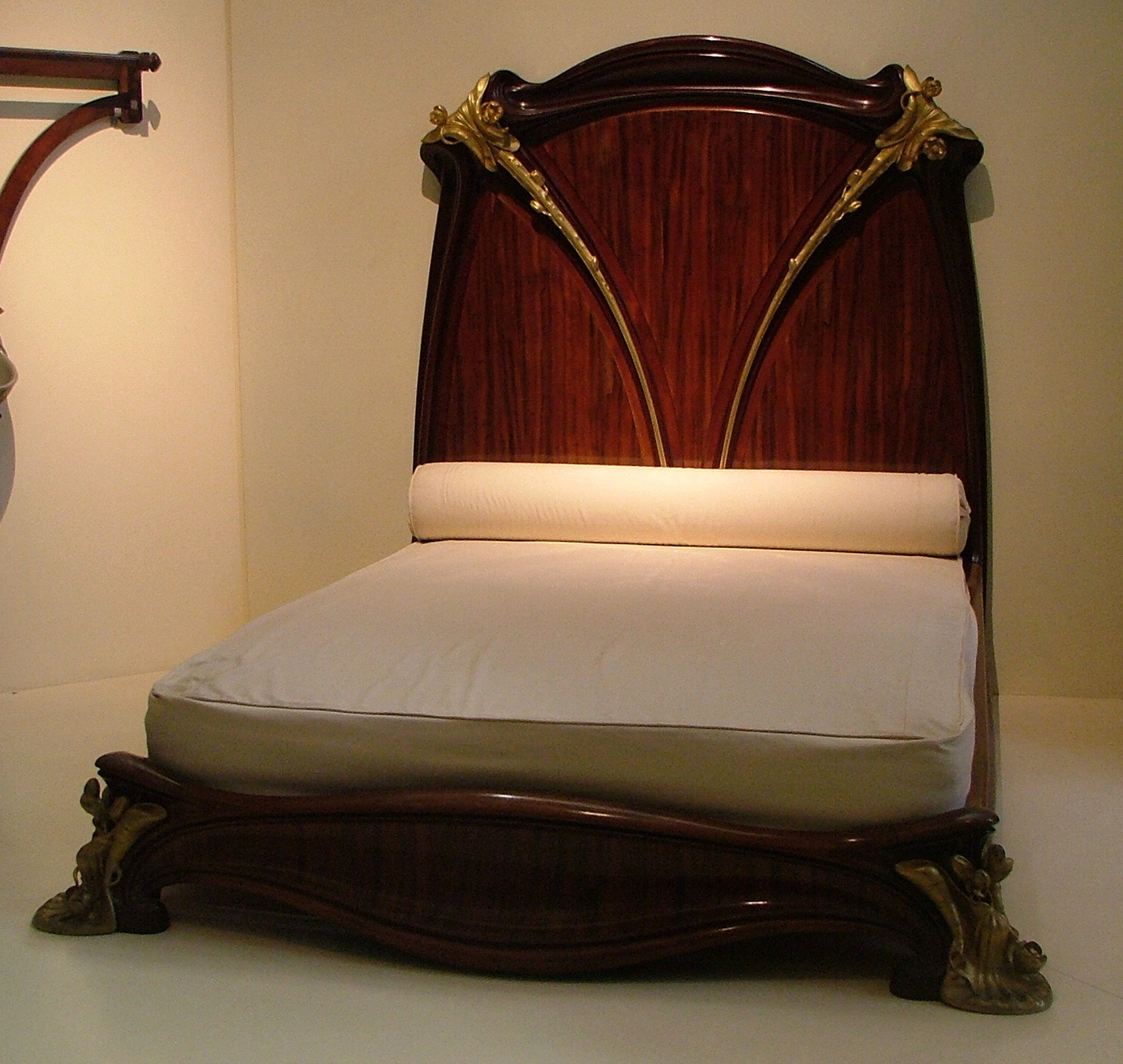
The "Water Lily" bed by Louis Majorelle (1902-1903), Musée d'Orsay, Paris

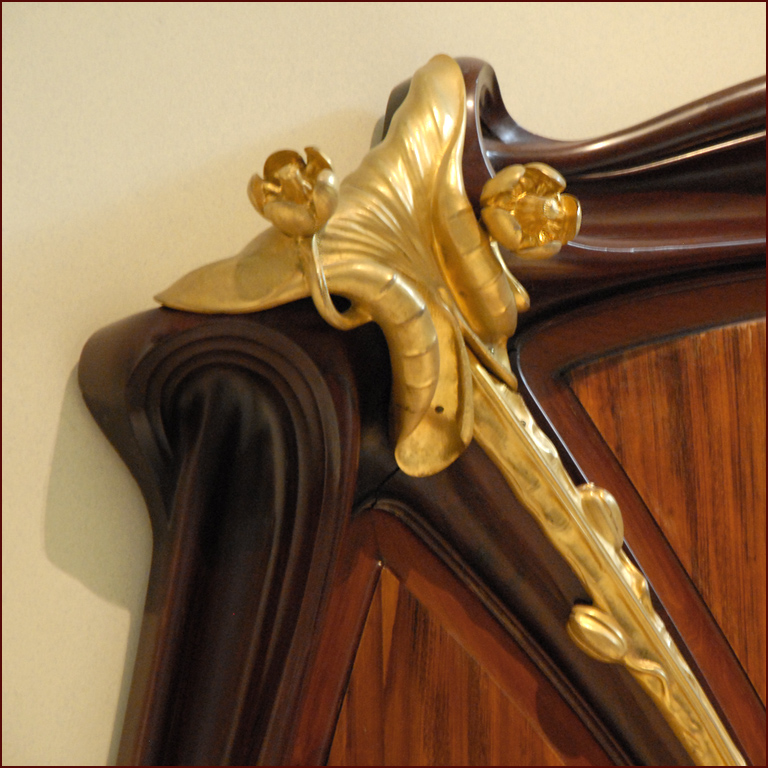
Detail of the "Water Lily" bed by Louis Majorelle, Musée d'Orsay, Paris

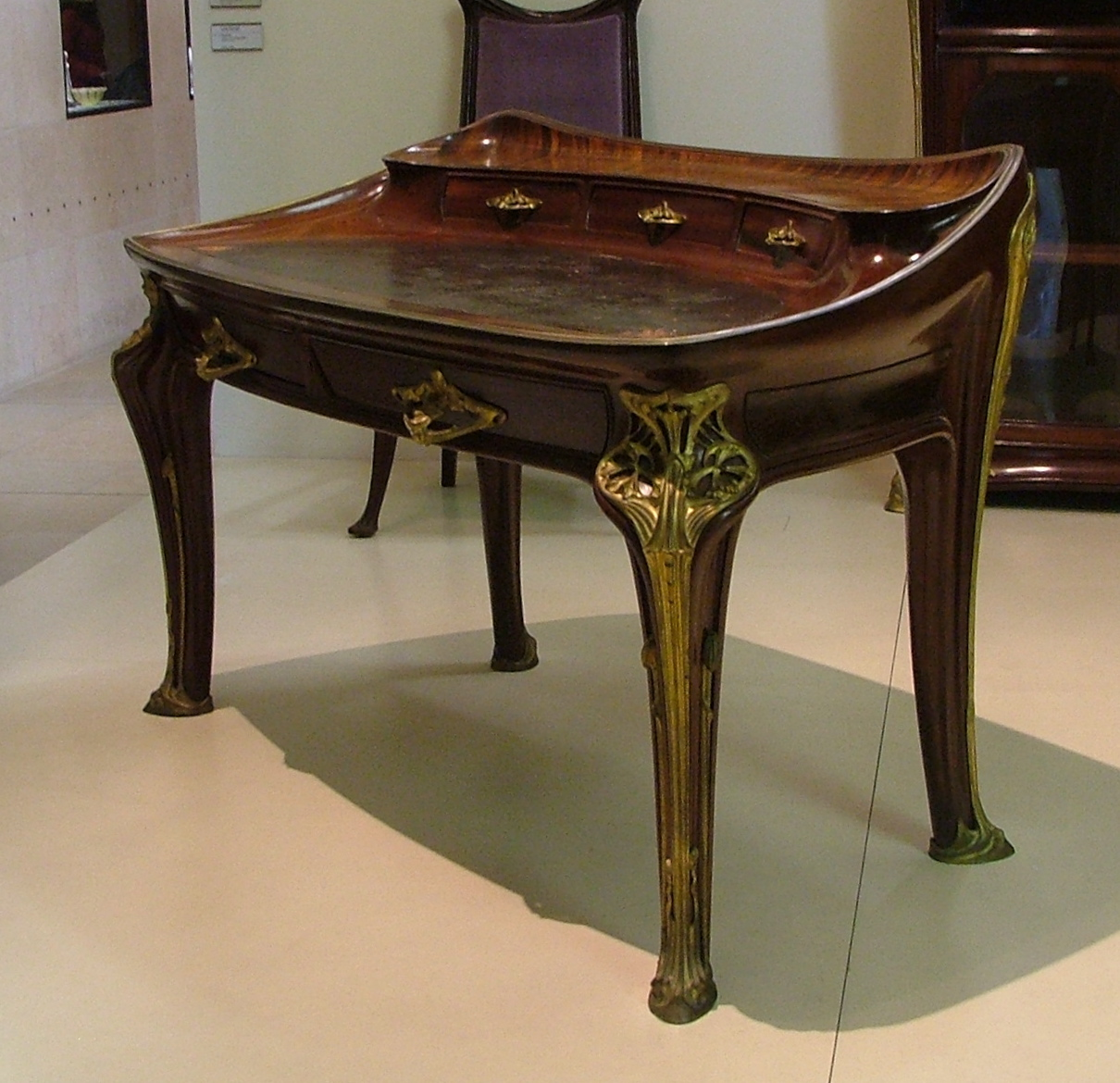
Orchid Desk by Louis Majorelle (1903–04), made of snakewood, gilded bronze and copper, Musée d'Orsay, Paris

== Stained glass ==
Stained glass was another Art Nouveau specialty in Nancy. The best-known artists were Jacques Grüber, Émile André, and Eugène Vallin, who often worked together on projects, and often worked with Majorelle, Daum, and the other Nancy designers.

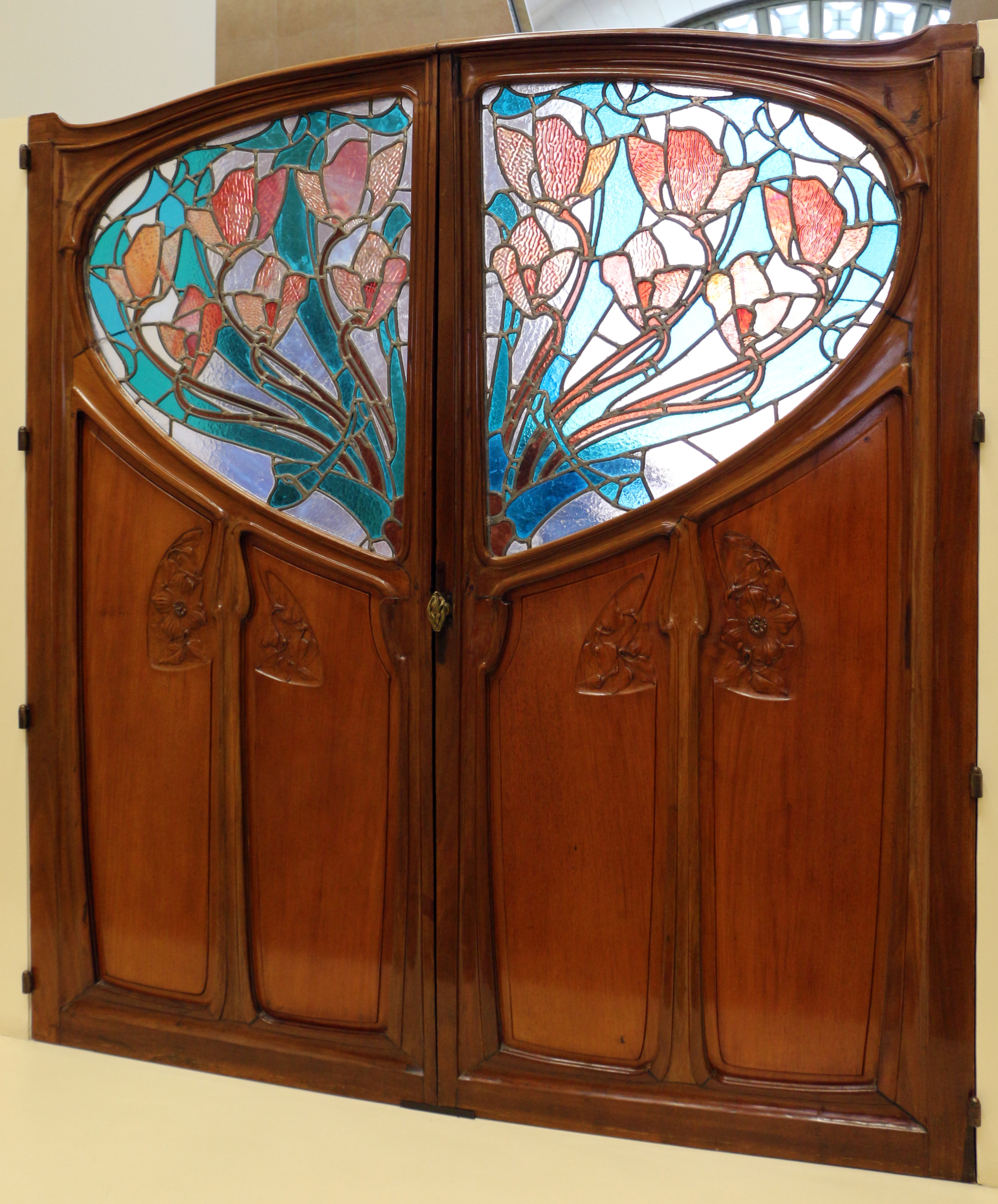
Doors with stained glass for the Store of Francois Vaexlaire in Nancy (1901), glass by Jacques Grüber, doors by Émile Andrè and Eugéne Vallin

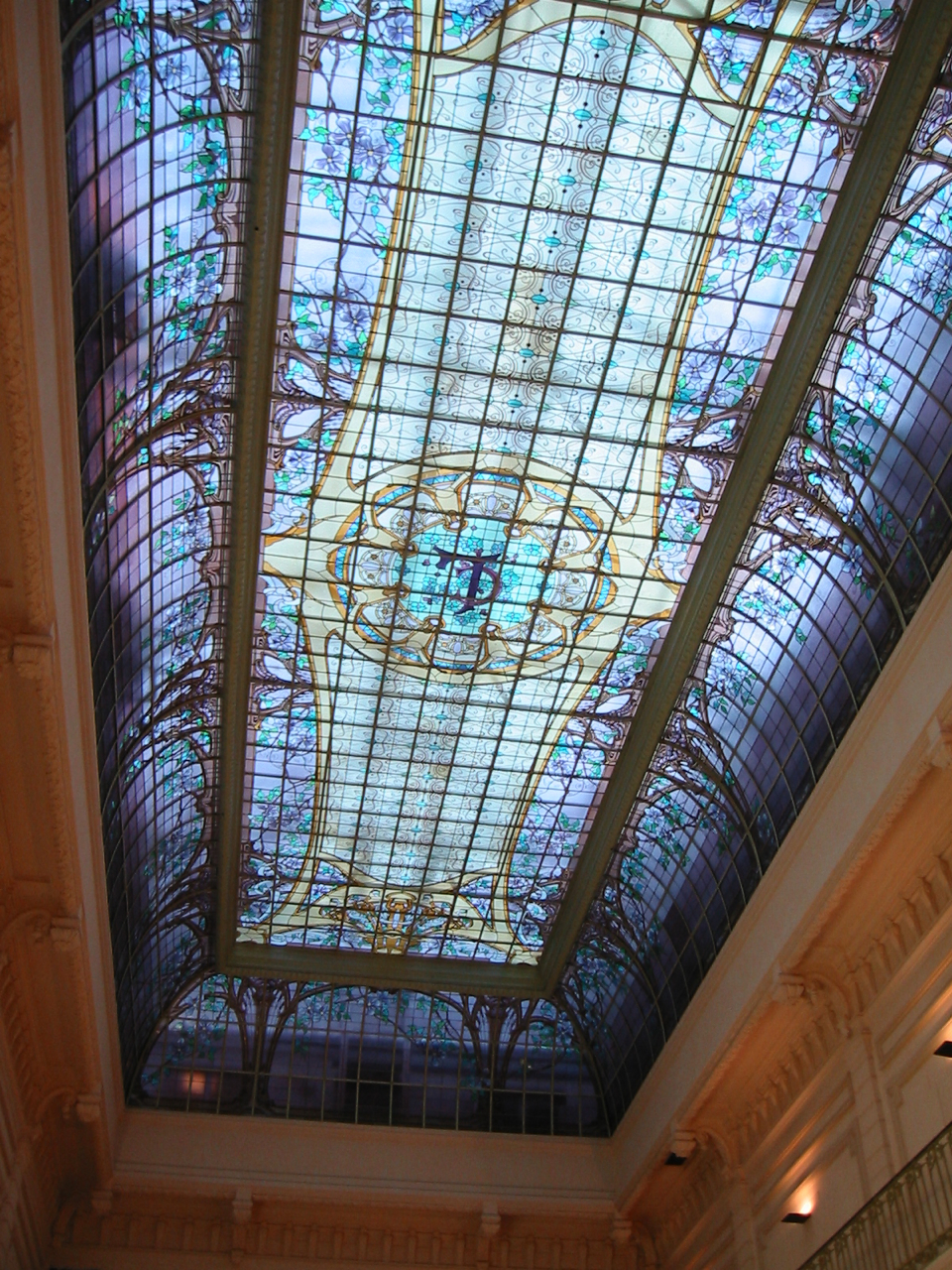
Skylight of Crédit-Lyonnais bank in Nancy by Jacques Grüber (1901)

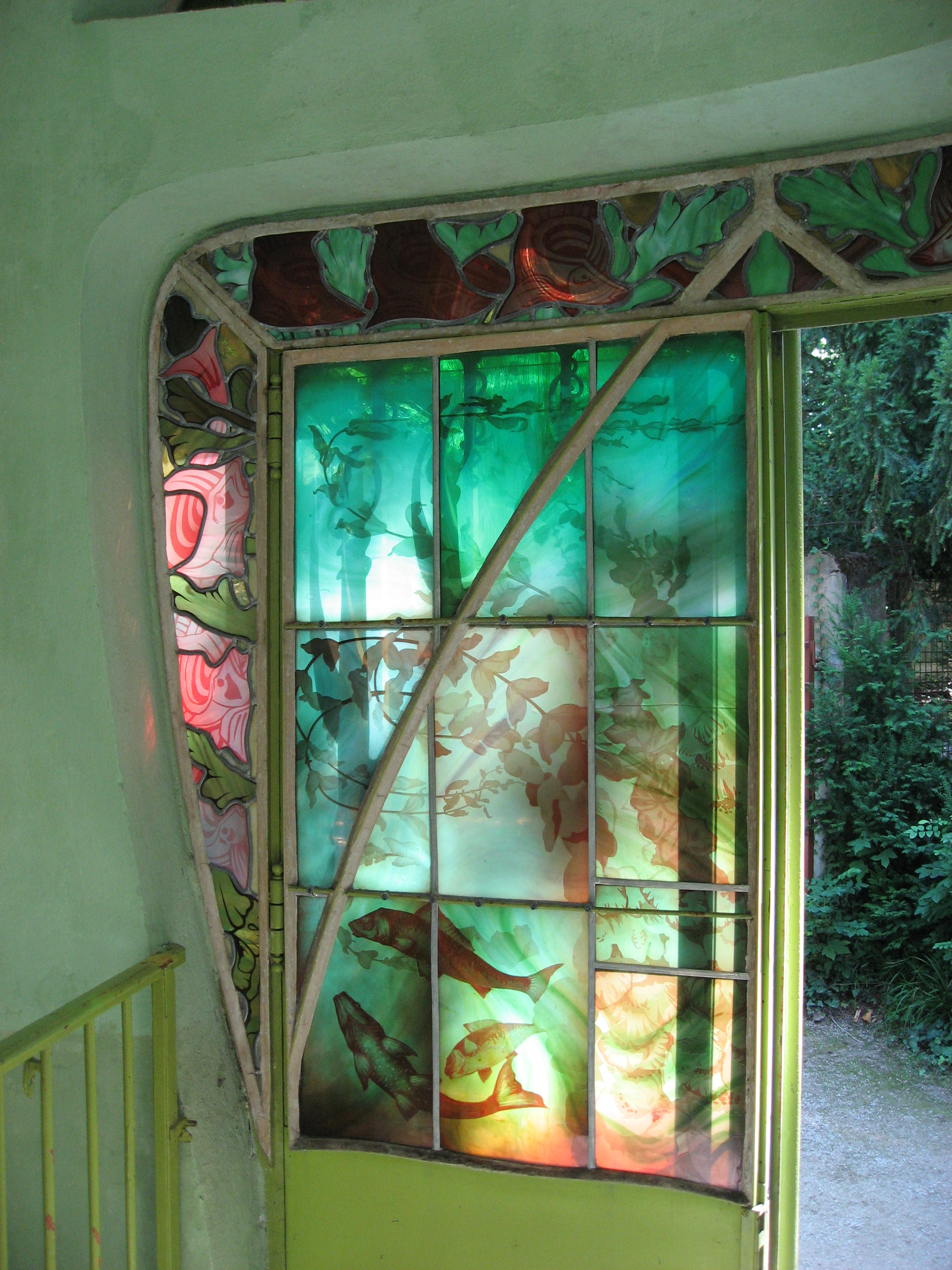
"Aquarium" window by Jacques Grüber (1907) (Musée de l'École de Nancy) (1904)

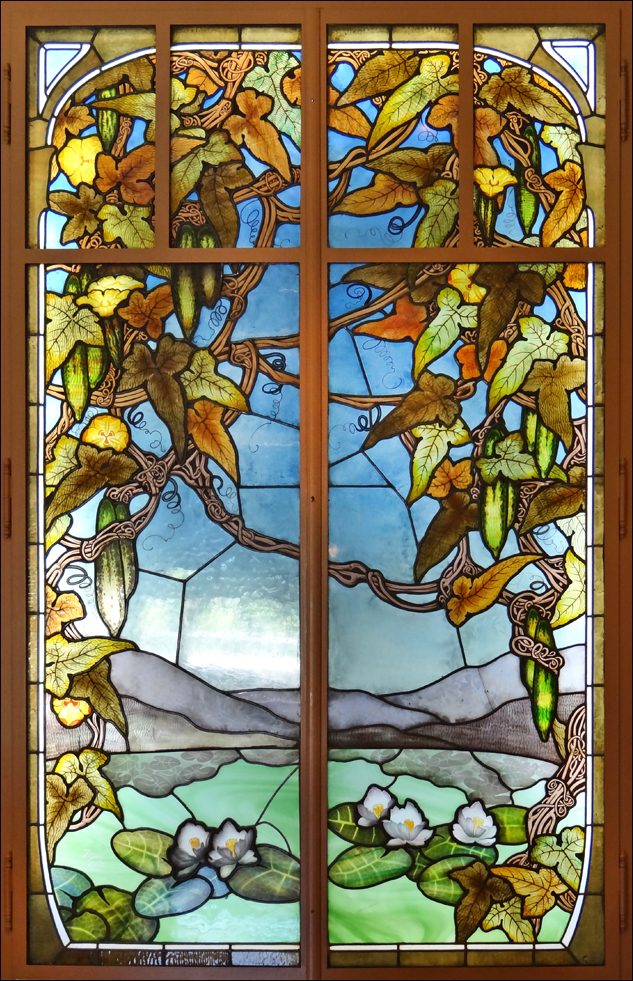
"Luffa and Water Lily" Window by Jacques Grüber (1907–08) Musée de l'Ecole de Nancy)

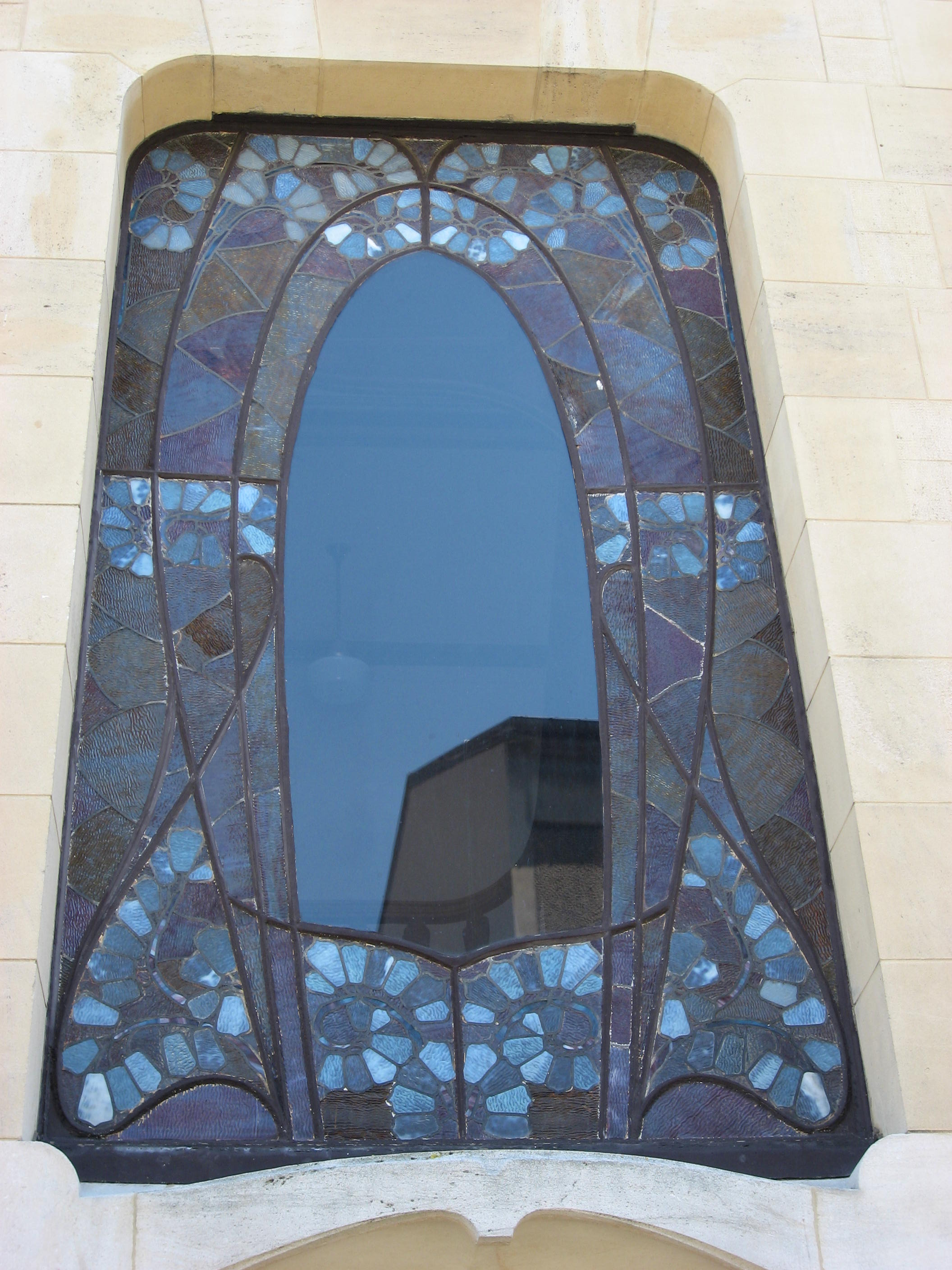
Window of the Villa Majorelle by Jacques Grüber (1907–08)

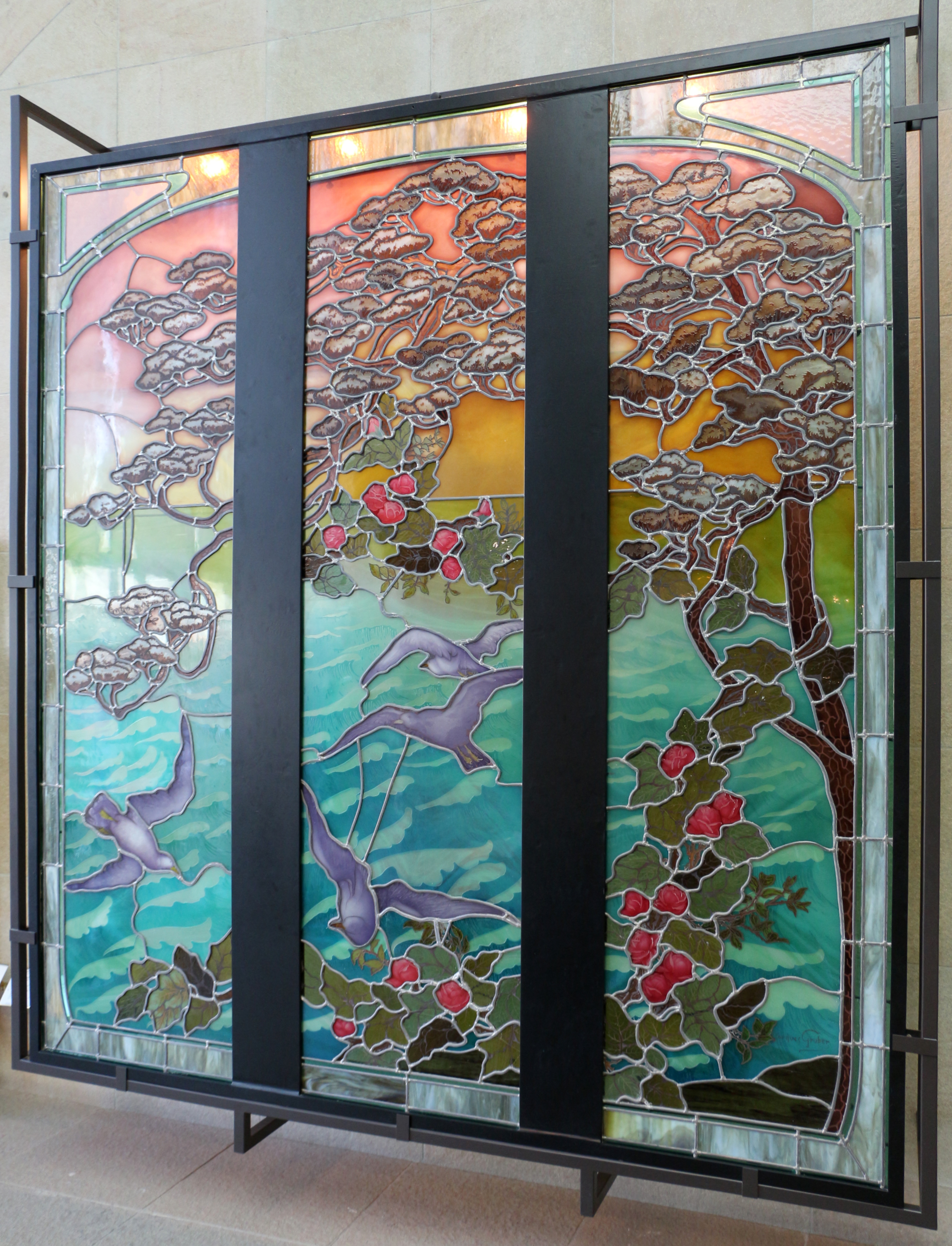
Window by Jacques Grüber (1908–09), Musée d'Orsay, Paris

== Architecture - the Villa Majorelle ==
Nancy contains a number of Art Nouveau houses and buildings created and decorated by Majorelle and other School members. The best-known is the Villa Majorelle, the residence of Louis Majorelle. It was constructed between 1901 and 1902, the peak of the Art Nouveau period, by the young Paris architect Henri Sauvage, with furniture and decoration by the members of the School of Nancy. After the death of Majorelle, most of the furnishings were sold and dispersed. Some, including the bedroom furniture, can now be seen in the Musée de l'École de Nancy.

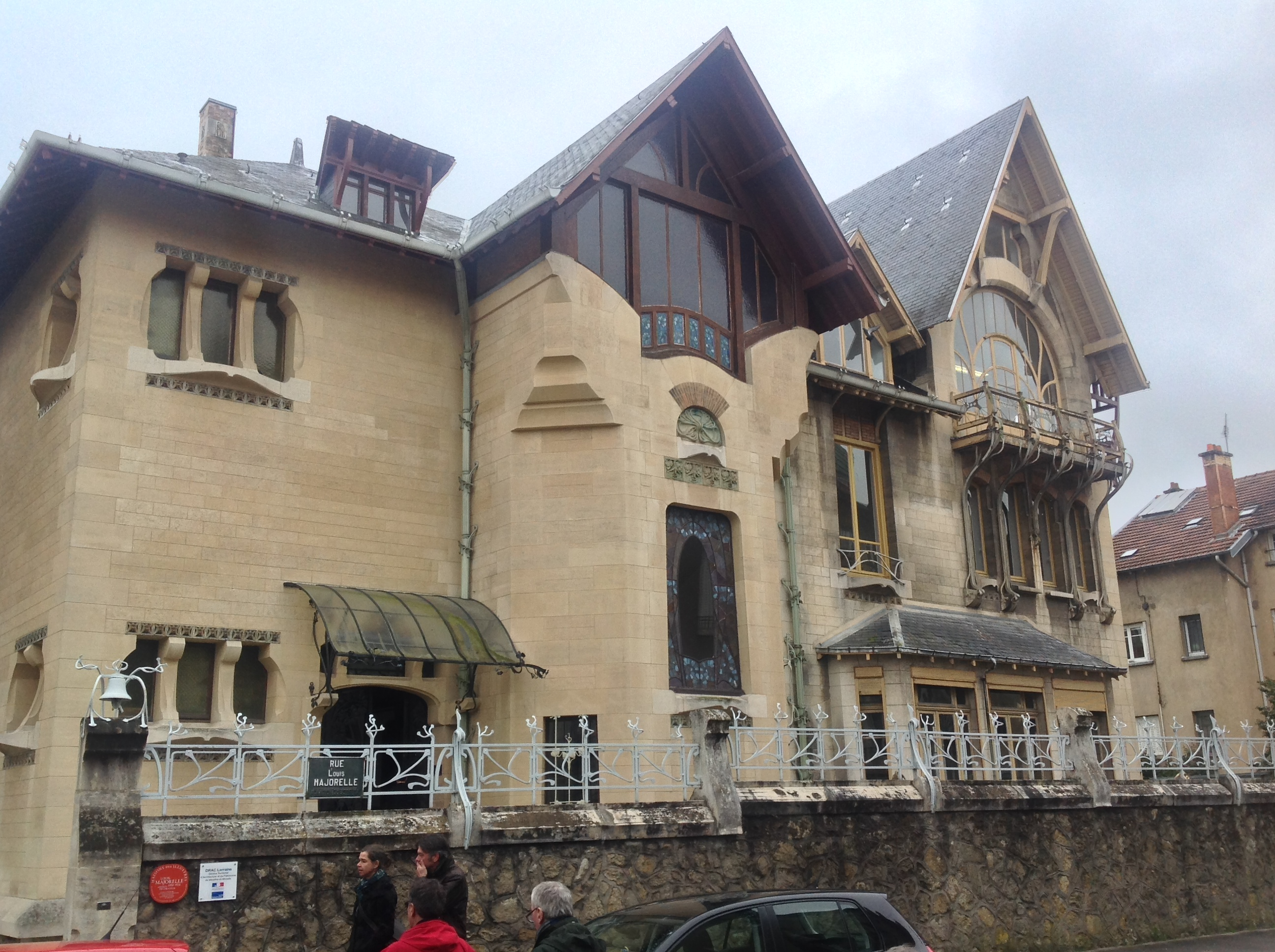
Facade of the Villa Majorelle

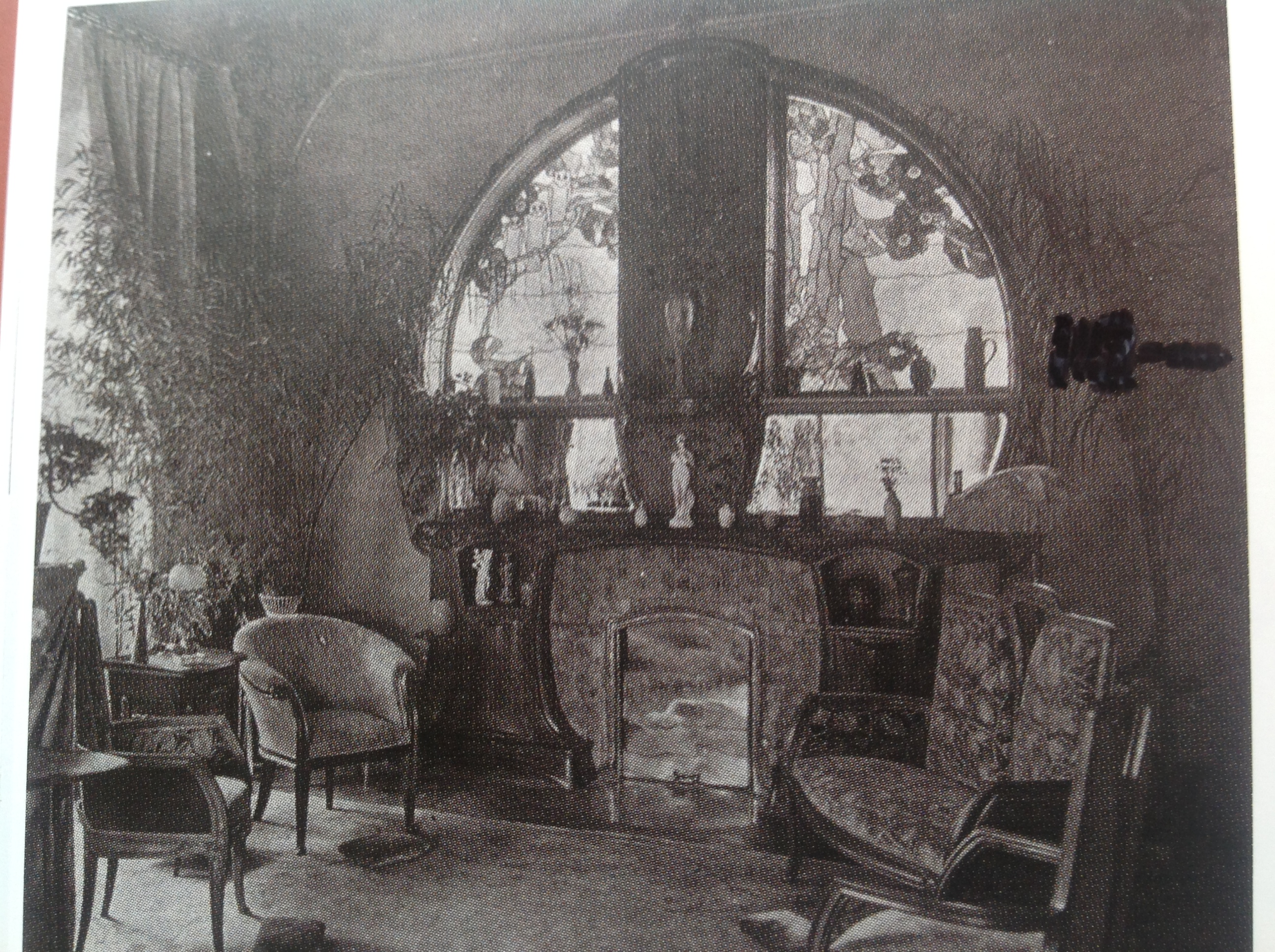
Original interior of the salon (1904)

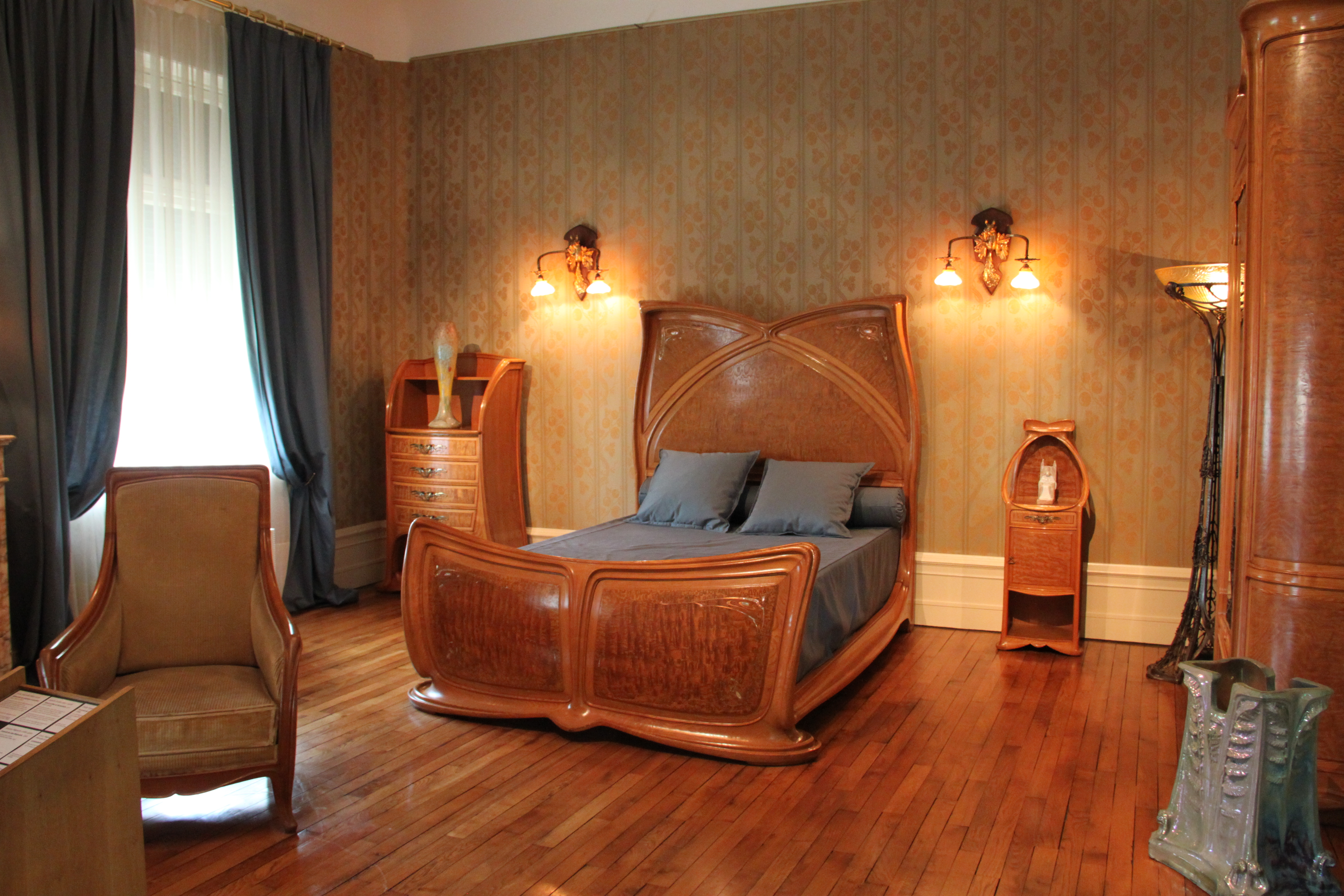
Bedroom furniture from the Villa Majorelle, now in the Musée de l'École de Nancy

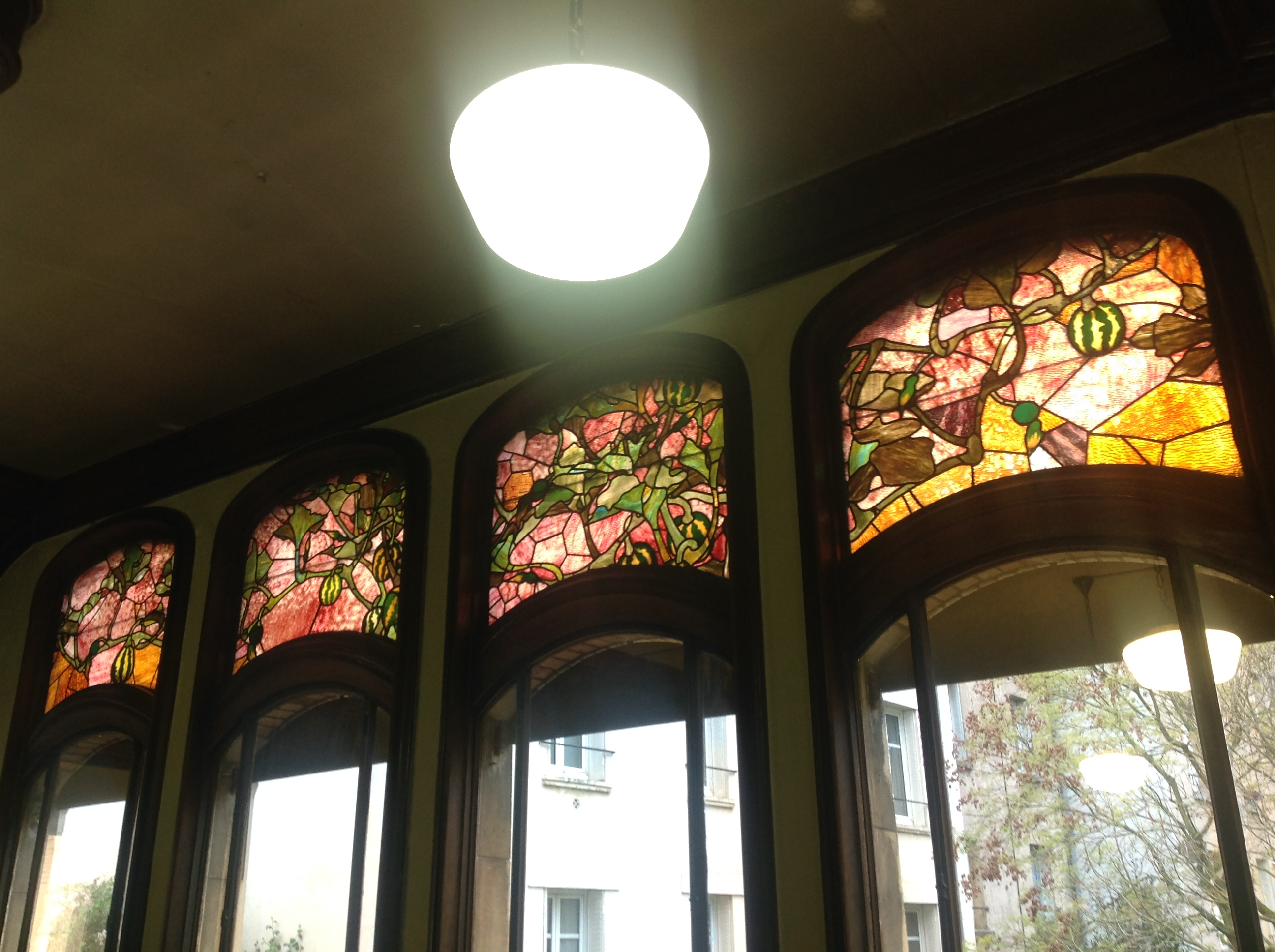
Dining room windows by Jacques Grüber

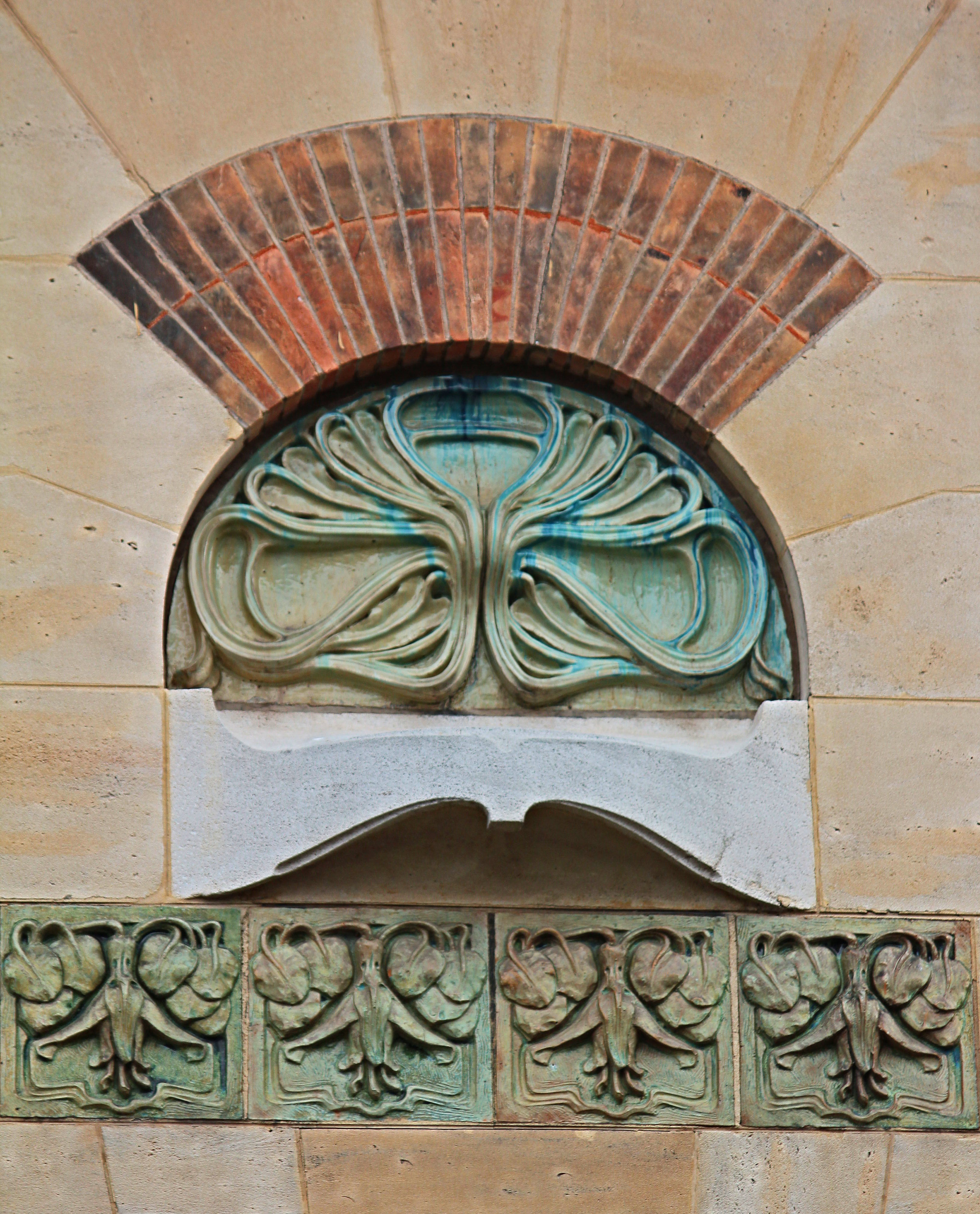
Ceramic facade decoration by Alexandre Bigot

== Notable collections in museums ==
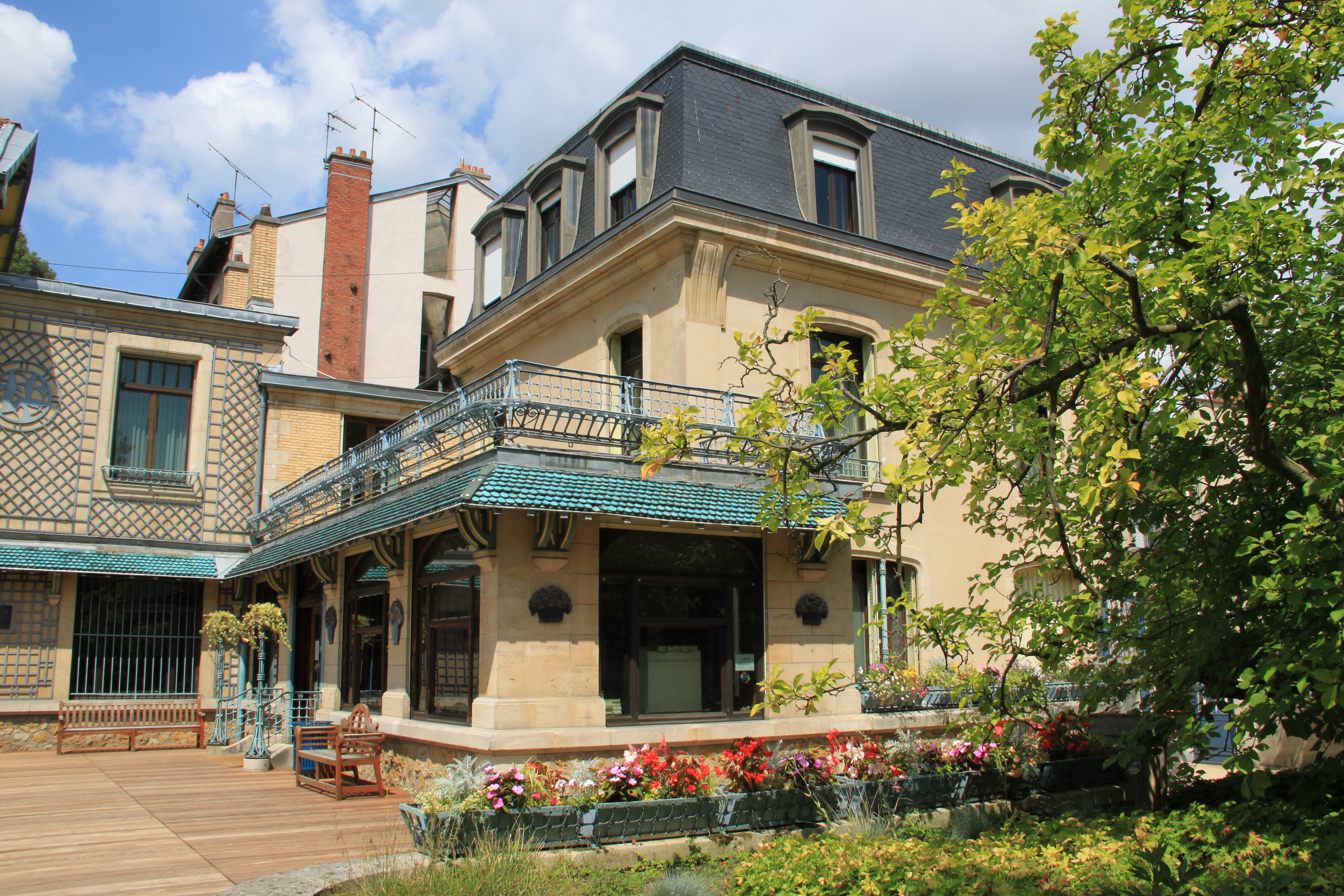
Musée de l'École de Nancy

Museums that have important collections of works from the École de Nancy include:

- Musée de l'École de Nancy Nancy
- Musée d'Orsay, Paris
- Musée des Arts Décoratifs, Paris

== See also ==
- Musée de l'École de Nancy
- Art Nouveau glass art

== Bibliography ==
- Fahr-Becker, Gabriele (2015). L'Art Nouveau (in French). H.F. Ullmann. ISBN 978-3-8480-0857-5.
- Sembach, Klaus-Jürgen (2013). L'Art Nouveau- L'Utopie de la Réconciliation (in French). Taschen. ISBN 978-3-8228-3005-5.
