= Jacques Grüber =

French woodworker and stained-glass artist(1870–1936)

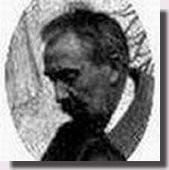
Jacques Grüber

Jacques Grüber (25 January 1870 – 15 December 1936) was a French woodworker and stained-glass artist.

== Biography ==
Grüber was born in Sundhouse (Alsace). After starting his training at the Fine Arts School of Nancy, where he would later be a teacher, he followed his learning with Gustave Moreau in Paris thanks to a student grant of Nancy.

In 1893, he made some decorations for Daum, some furniture for Majorelle and book covers for René Wiener.

In 1897, he founded his own studio where he specialised in glass working and stained glass windows, and in 1901 he was one of the founders of the École de Nancy. In 1914, he moved to Paris where he opened a studio in the 14th arrondissement.

He did the stained glass windows of the Villa Bleue in Barcelonnetten and panels in Châlons Cathedral.

He died in Paris. His son Francis Gruber was a famous painter and his son Jean-Jacques Grüber, was also a glass artist like his father. His granddaughter Jeannette Weiss Gruber also followed in her grandfathers footsteps.

== Stained glass windows ==
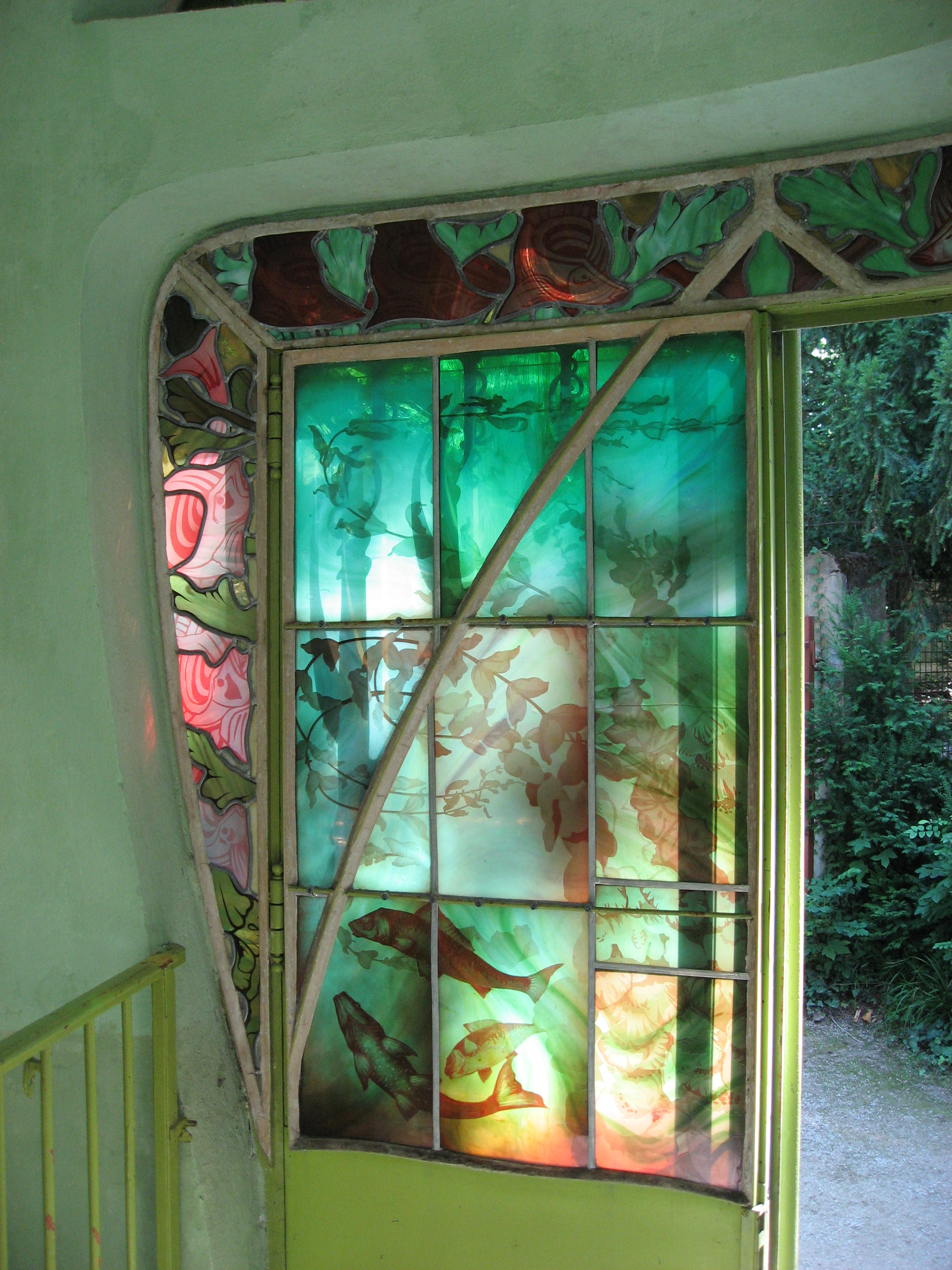
Glass window in the Musée de l'École de Nancy, France, created around 1904

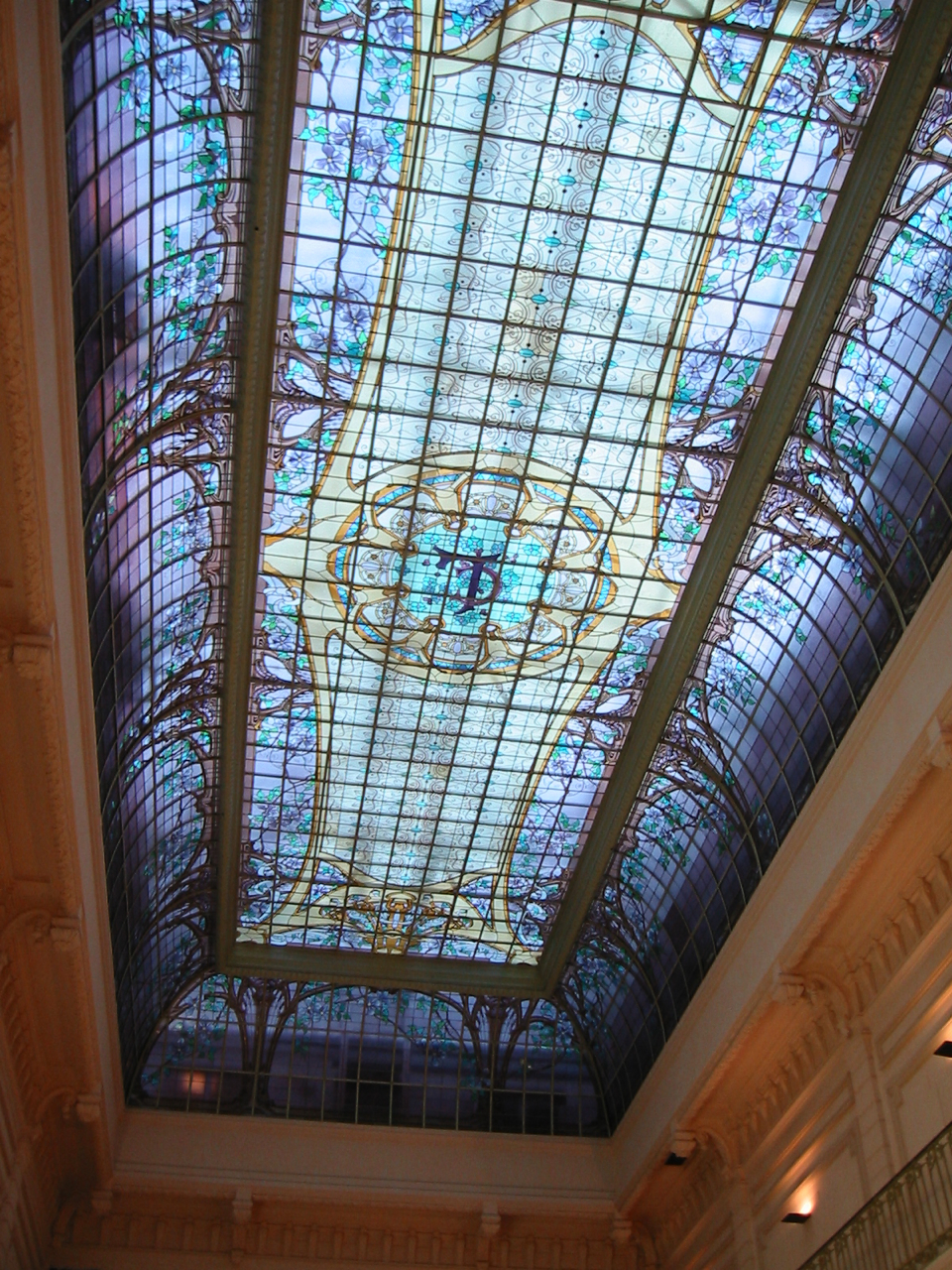
The Crédit Lyonnais of Nancy houses the largest stained glass window in the École de Nancy style, created in 1901, Nancy, France

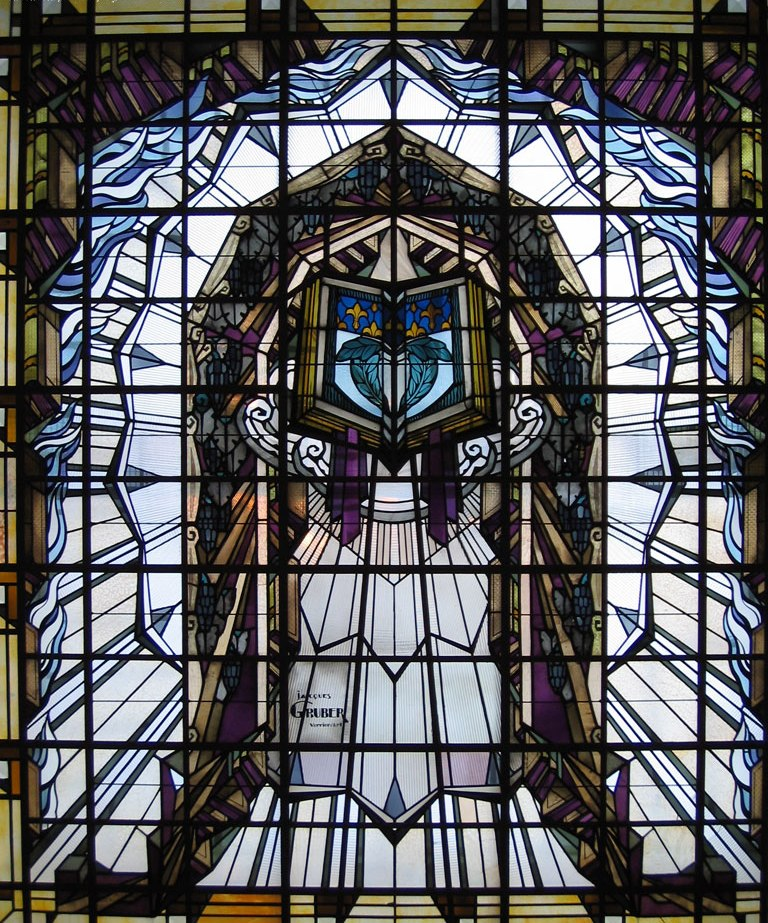
Stained glass of the reading room of the Carnegie Library of Reims, France

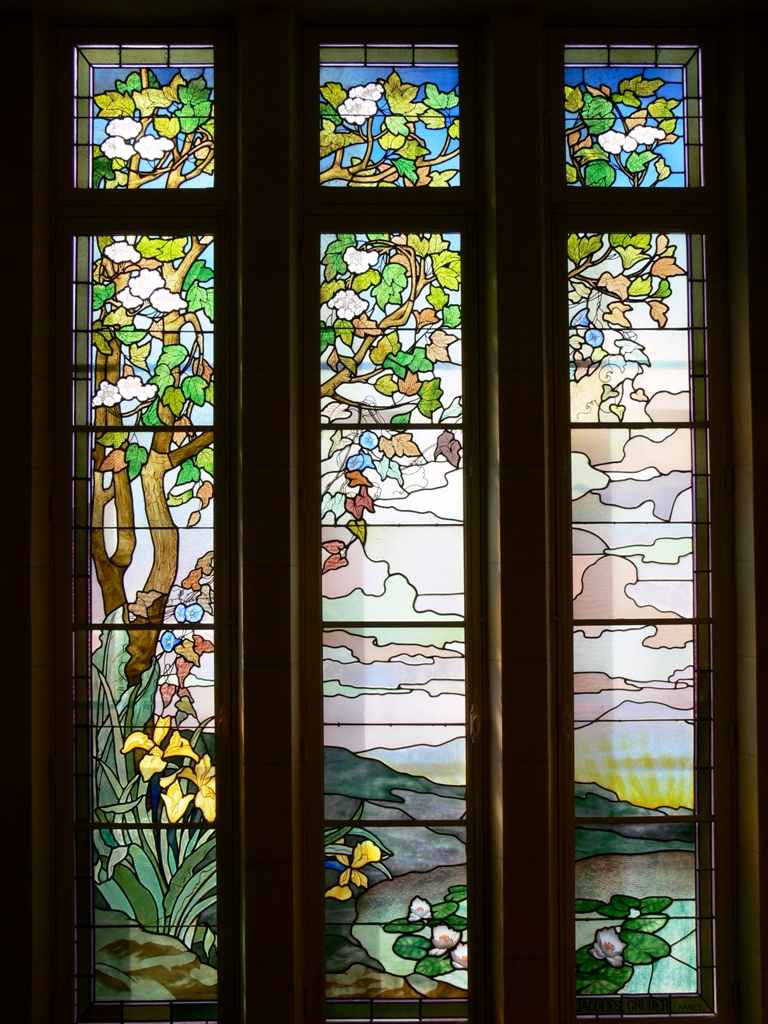
Stained glass in the staircase of the Euville town hall, France

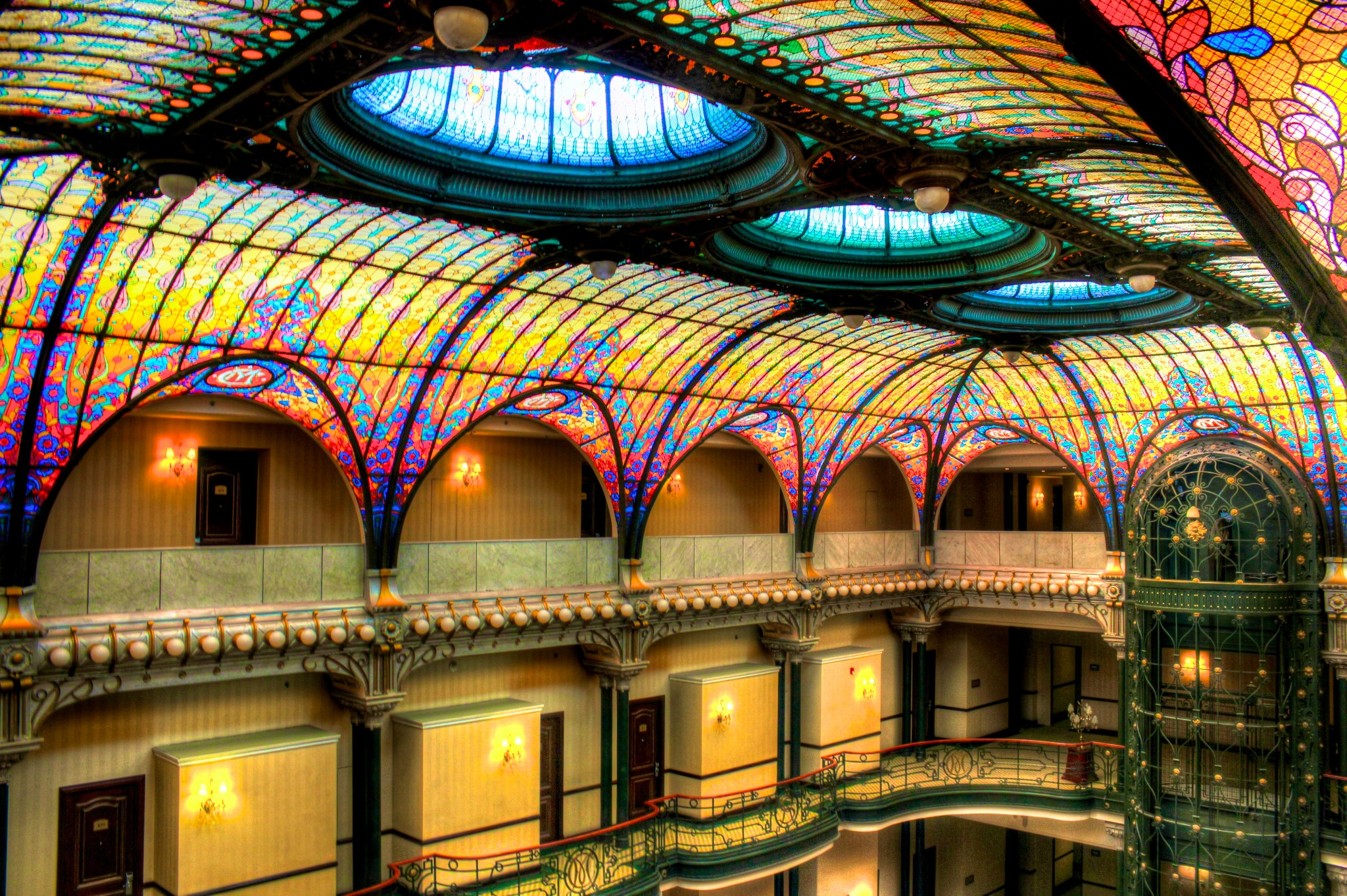
stained Glass ceiling in the Hotel Ciudad de Mexico, Mexico

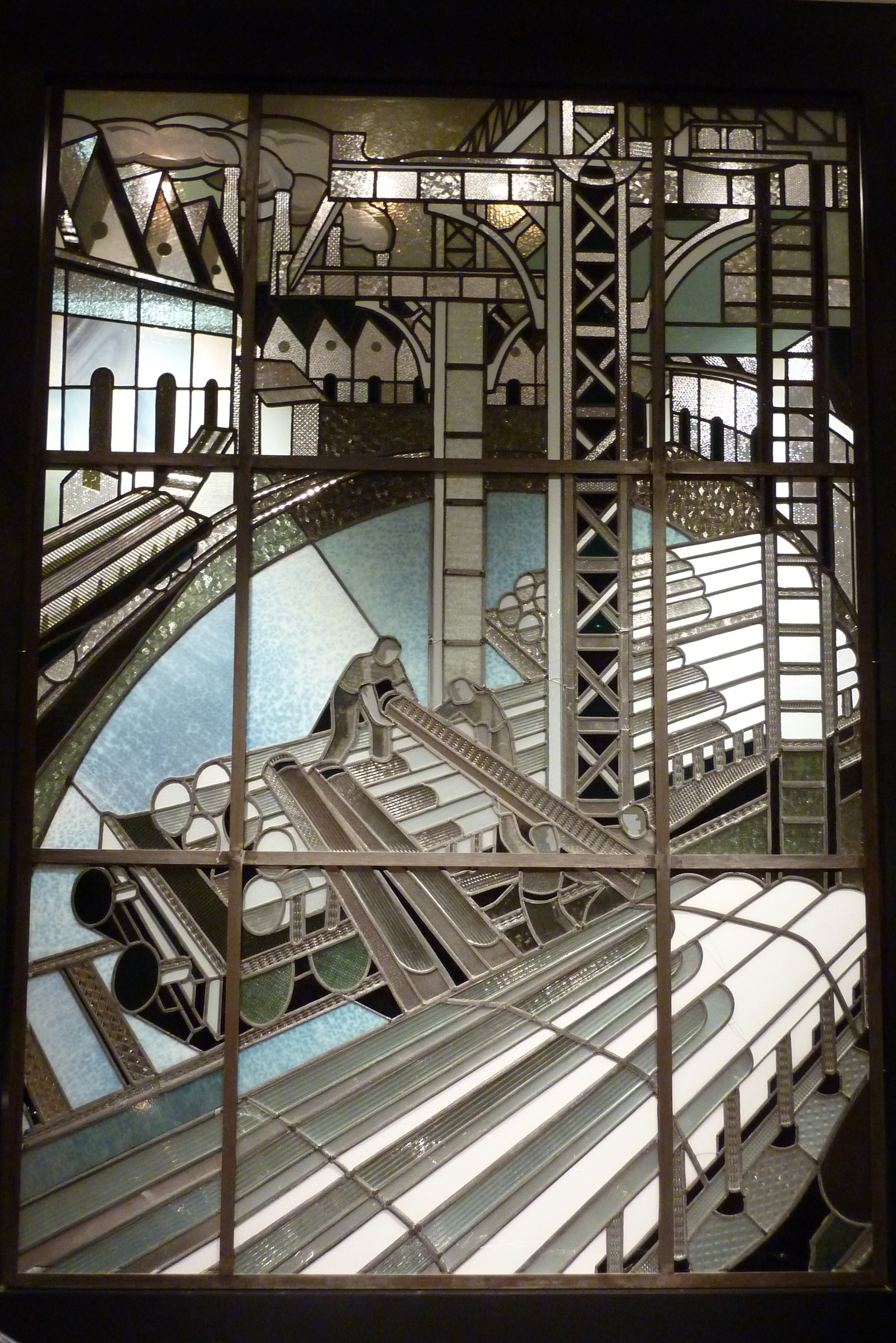
Stained glass window in the collection of the Musée des Arts Décoratifs, Paris, created around 1930 in Nancy, France

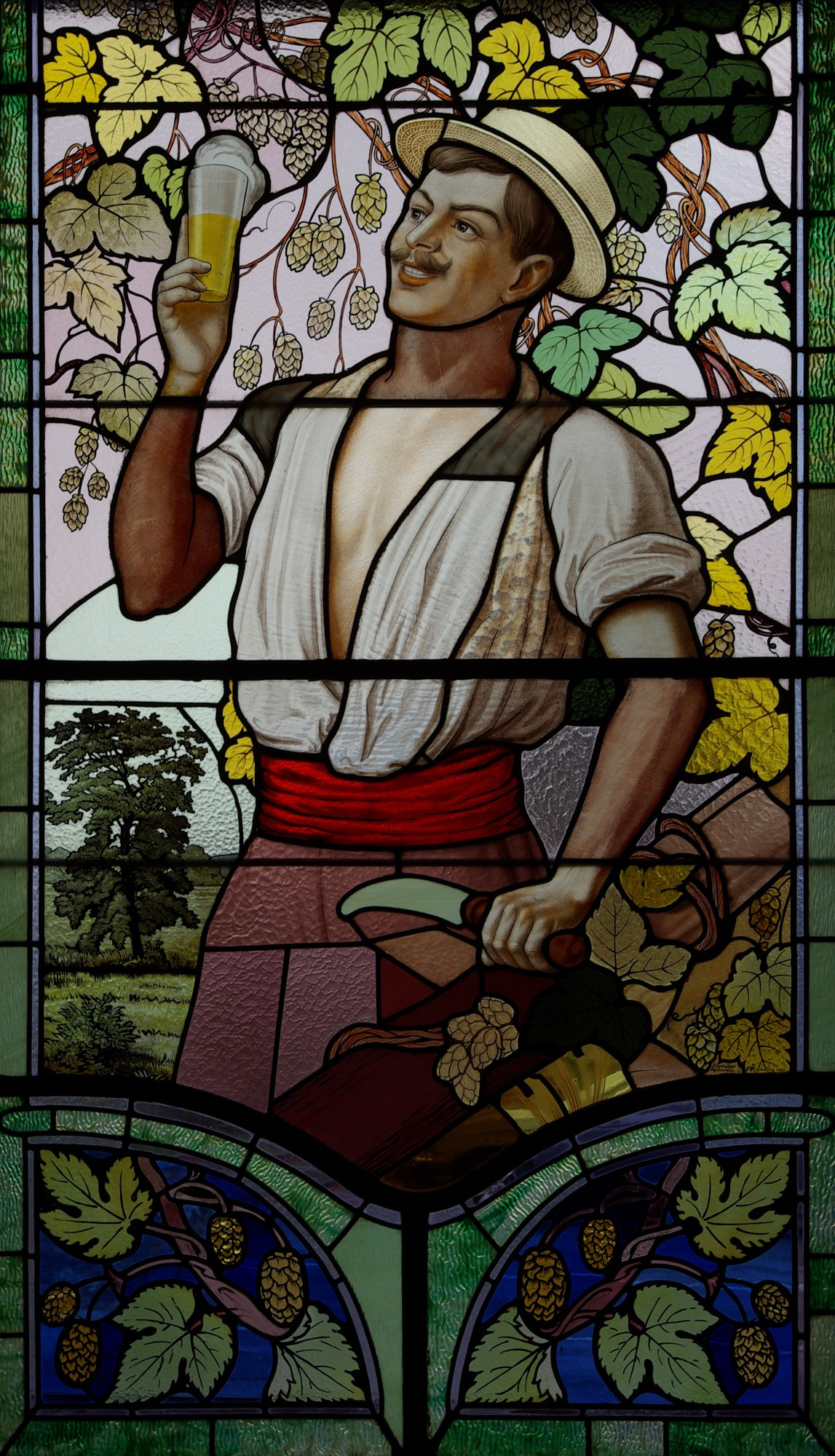
Saint-Nicolas de Port in Meurthe-et-Moselle, Lorraine, France
