= Joseph Hiriart =

French architect (1888–1946)

- Born: 1888
- Died: 1946 (aged 57–58)
- Education: École des Beaux-Arts
- Occupation: Architect

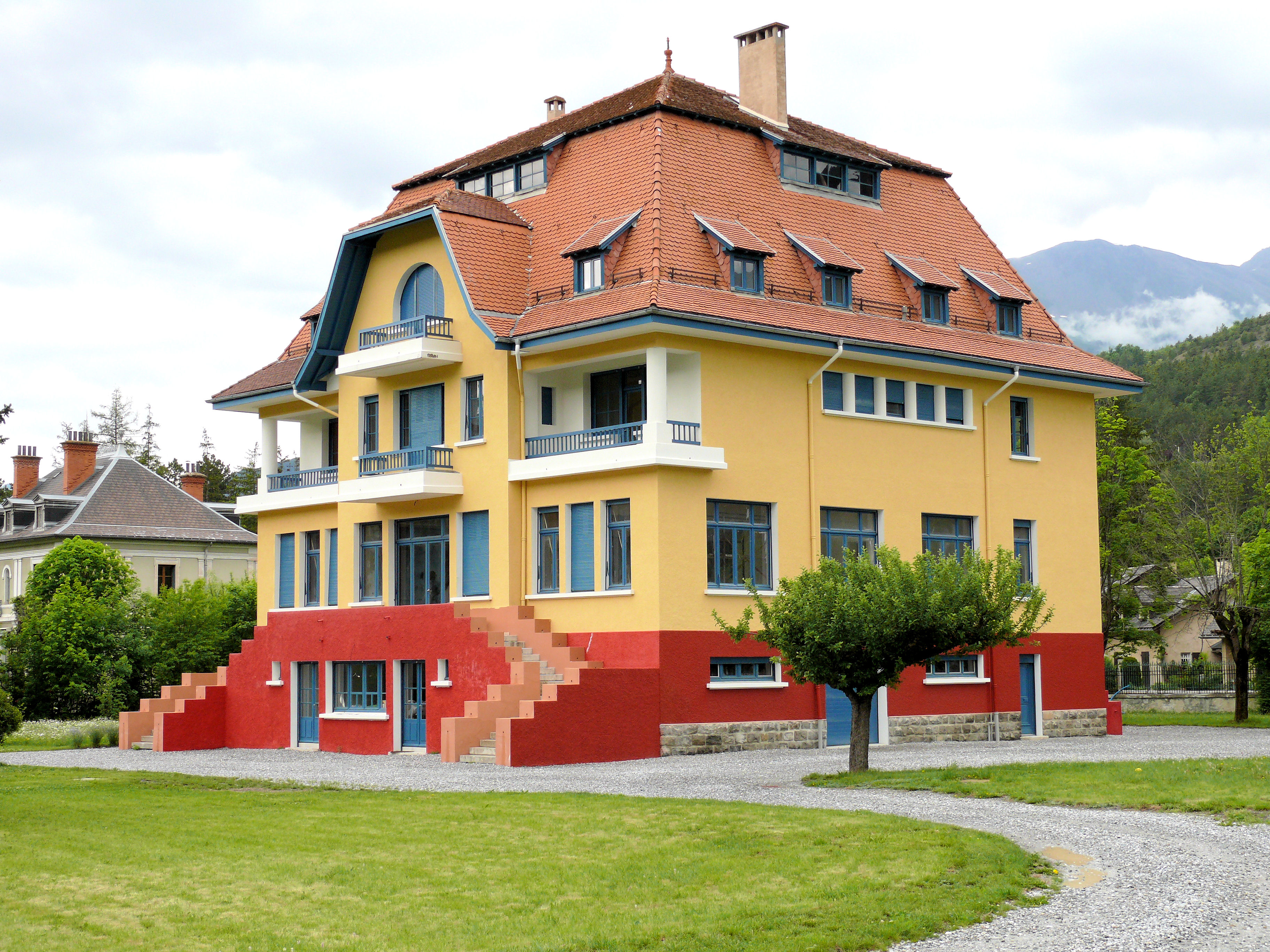
The Blue Villa in Barcelonnette, a "monument historique" designed by Hiriart.

Joseph Hiriart (1888–1946) was a French architect.

== Early life ==
Joseph Hiriart was born in 1888. He graduated from the École des Beaux-Arts in 1922.

== Career ==
Hiriart specialized in Art Deco architecture. He designed the Villa Leïhorra in Ciboure and the Blue Villa in Barcelonnette, both of which are official historical monuments. He also designed the Musee de la mer in Biarritz.

== Personal life ==
Hiriart resided in Saint-Paul-sur-Ubaye. His brother-in-law, Joseph Signoret, was a director of the El Palacio de Hierro in Mexico City, Mexico.

== Death ==
Hiriart died in 1946.
