= Jhordy Hiriart =

- Born: Mexico
- Occupation: Actor

Jhordy Hiriart is a Mexican actor, casting director, producer and singer, born in Mexico City. He has appeared in several TV shows and films

== TV Shows and Films ==
- Rebelde (Televisa, 2005)
- Bajo el mismo cielo (Telemundo)
- Santa Diabla (Telemundo)
- Buscando Nirvana (Film)
- Eva la Trailera (Telemundo)
- Dama Y Obrero (Telemundo)
- Los 8 (short film)
- The Cold Case murder (short film)
- A change Of Heart (Film)
- Voltea Para Que Te Enamores (Univision)
- Ruta 35, La Valvula de Escape (Univision)
