= Nancy municipal archives =

Public institution in Nancy, France

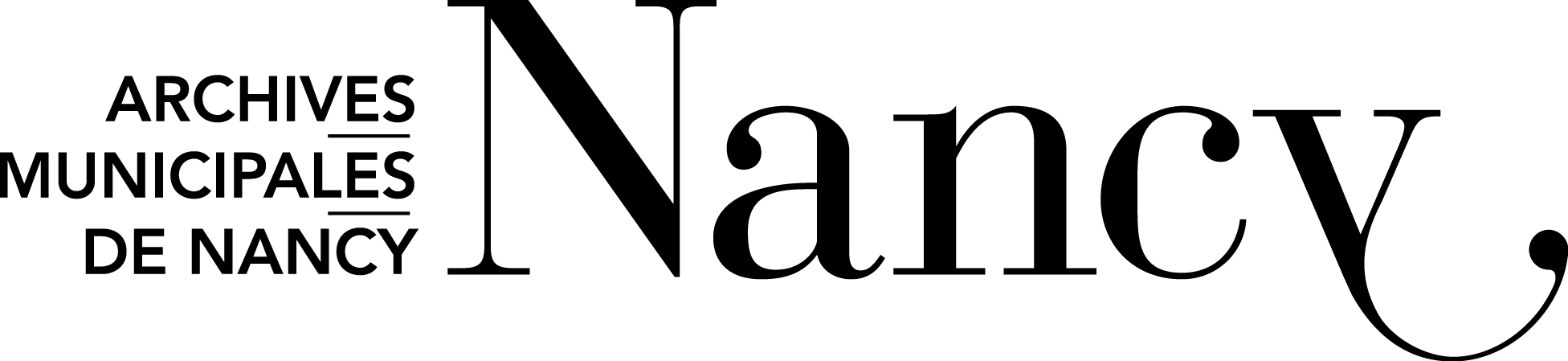

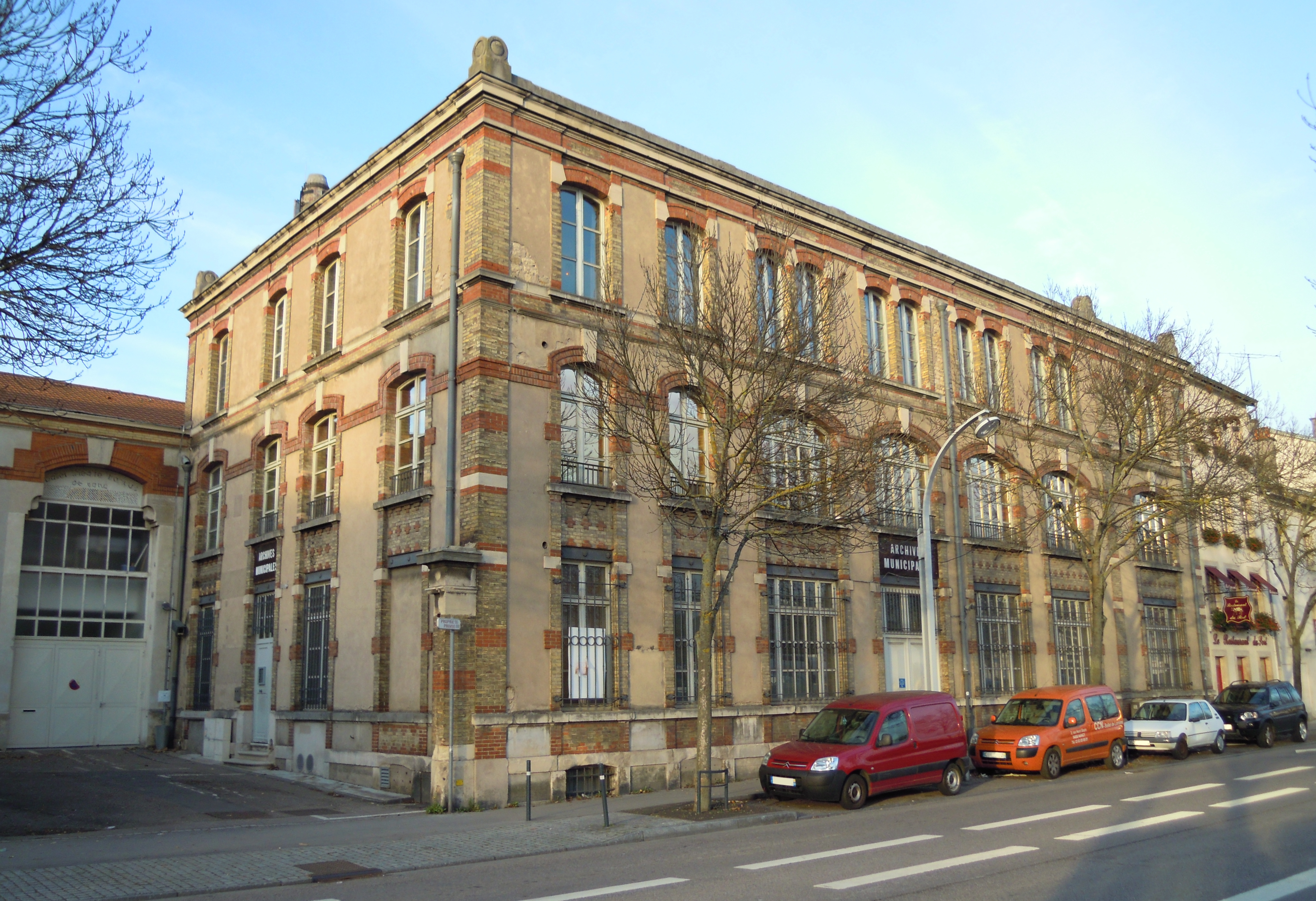
- Interactive map of Nancy municipal archives
- 48.6959413°N 6.1897177°E
- Location: Nancy, France
- Affiliation: Service interministériel des archives de France
- Website: archives.nancy.fr/accueil/

Nancy’s municipal archives is a public institution in the city of Nancy, France. It serves as a municipal archive for materials from the Middle Ages onwards. It is located at 3 rue Henri-Bazin in Nancy.

== Building's History ==
=== Industrial Origins ===
Shoe-making was an important industrial activity in Nancy during the 19th century, especially the work of shoe trader Isaac Gaudchaux-Picard, who set up in the tannery district to manufacture his own products.

The industrial shoe-making sector experienced a booming success, with the support of the Spire family, from 1870 onwards. Charles-Édouard Spire bought the premises situated on 5 faubourg Sainte-Catherine (now rue Henri-Bazin) on 9 November 1878, from Raphaël Michiniau, another shoe-maker. Two years later, the factory was completed.

=== The Spire Firm ===
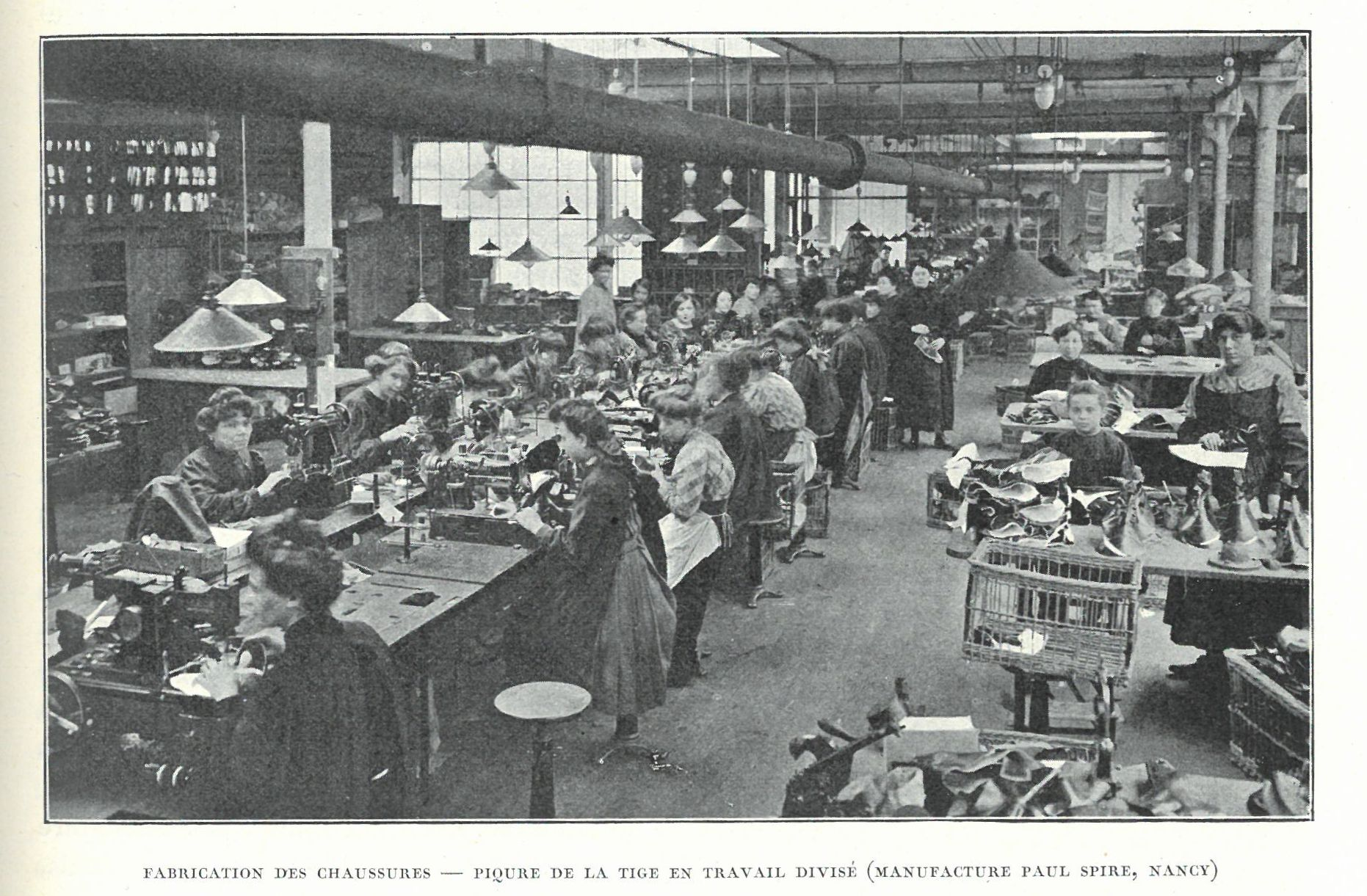
The factory in 1909.

The building faced some challenges. A fire on 15 August 1899 had catastrophic socio-economic impacts on the 400 factory workers. For two years, production was moved to avenue de Strasbourg. A new building was approved by the city in 1900 and the factory was entirely rebuilt by the architect Félicien César the following year. A 25-meter high chimney was added, joining the others in the industrial Meurthe-canal neighbourhood at the beginning of the 20th century.

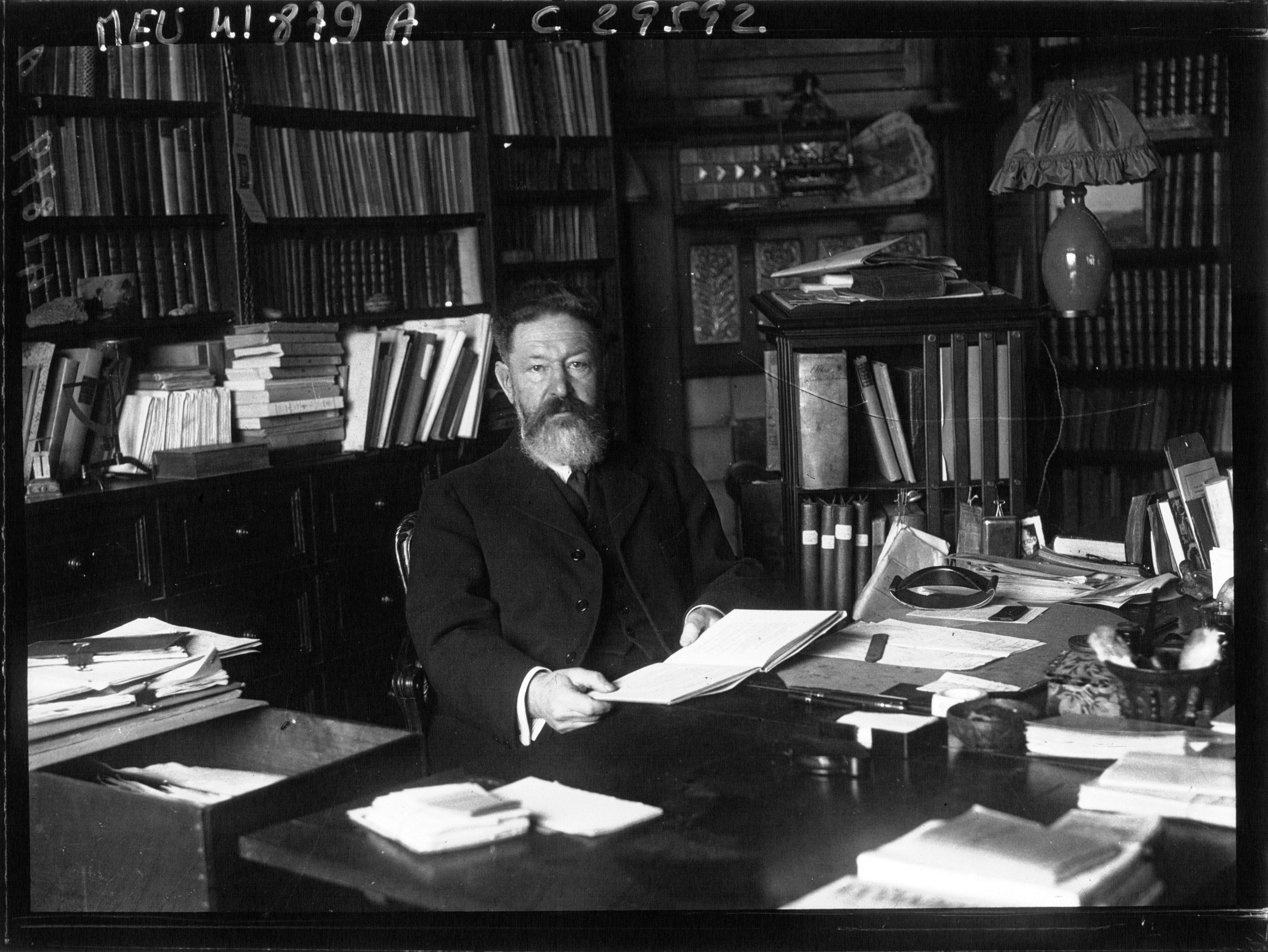
André Spire in 1927.

In 1902, Paul Spire took over the management of the factory and hired André Coblentz. From this point onward, the company went by "Spico". This was the most prosperous period for the business. Paul Spire became a member of Nancy's chamber of commerce. As a committee member for International Exhibition of the East of France in 1909, Spire's factory was presented as a model for the industry.

During the First World War, Paul Spire was drafted. His elder brother André Spire oversaw the factory and took over the familial business. When managing the factory, André faced economic as well as structural issues. The factory temporarily relocated to the outskirts of Paris and then to Limoges, only to return to Nancy in 1922. Following the end of the war, productivity declined and the business faced strong union activity in the shoemaking industry, including frequent strikes. Manufacturing ceased in 1935.

List of archivists
Responsable	Début	Fin
Henri Lepage	1864	1874
Emile Roussel	1874	1881
Vacancy	1882	1905
Paul Denis	1906	1937
Vacancy	1938	1967
Michèle Renson	1968	2005
Daniel Peter	2005	2018
Pascale Etiennette	2019	2022
Sébastien Rembert	2022	current
