= Concert Tunisien =

Popular Oriental-themed entertainment in France, 1860s–1910s

- Nickname: Concert tunisiens Concerts tunisiens
- Founded: c. 1860's
- Founders: Justine Valck; Lagneau; Léon Bessas; René Valadon; Detante; Maurice Gribinski
- Dissolved: c. 1910's
- Location: France
- Members: La Belle Fatma
- Affiliations: Concert Cosmopolite; 1867 Paris Exposition; 1878 Paris Exposition; Exposition internationale de Nice; 1889 Paris Exposition; Antwerp International Exposition (1894); 1900 Paris Exposition; Exposition Internationale de l'Est de la France; Moulin Rouge

The Concert Tunisien, also known as Concert tunisiens and Concerts tunisiens was a form of popular entertainment in France in the late 19th and early 20th centuries. It typically presented as a travelling fairground attraction or entertainment establishment featuring music, dance and other performances associated with exoticised representations of North African and Middle Eastern entertainment, popularized in France by the Paris Exposition Universelle. The term Concert Tunisien refers both to the type of attraction and to individual establishments or troupes operating under the name.

== History ==
The term concerts tunisiens was already in use in connection with the 1867 Paris Exposition, where music critic Oscar Comettant listed it among the exhibition's international musical attractions. A small concert Tunisien was also present at the 1878 Paris Exposition, where Rachel Eny, later known as La Belle Fatma, performed.

During the 1880s, concerts tunisiens became a recurring form of entertainment at French fairs and theatres. Contemporary newspapers documented the attractions at fairs in Reims, Épernay and elsewhere, while a travelling establishment operated by Justine Valck was reported across the fairgrounds of southern France.

The 1889 Paris Exposition gave the form of entertainment particular prominence. Concerts tunisiens were presented alongside Tunisian and Algerian displays in the exhibition's Rue du Caire and were among the paid spectacles offered to visitors. La Belle Fatma was associated with one of the Tunisian attractions.

The term continued to be used during the 1890s and early 20th century for attractions at fairs, exhibitions and theatres in France and elsewhere. The form remained visible at the 1900 Paris Exposition, where concerts tunisiens et algériens were among the foreign spectacles presented to visitors. The expression continued to appear in reports of fairground entertainment in the early 20th century, including in 1911.

== Performance ==
Contemporary descriptions of the concerts tunisiens document performances combining dance, instrumental music and singing. The presentation also involved a defined stage arrangement, costumes and decorative furnishings.

=== Setting ===
At the 1889 Paris Exposition, the concerts tunisiens were presented on a raised platform. The women and musicians were seated on sofas, while the dancers performed on the platform. In the establishment associated with La Belle Fatma, the performer was seated on a raised platform described as resembling a throne, accompanied by her father, percussionists, three dancers and a piano player.

The interior furnishings also formed part of the presentation. A contemporary description states that the tables, stools, lamps and cups of the Tunisian attraction came directly from Tunisia. The furnishings of the concert at the Tunisian Souk were also described after the 1889 Paris Exposition. The inventory included twelve mirrors, thirty-two lanterns, six divans, Turkish tables, hangings, flags, carpets, one hundred stools and fifty guéridons.

A 1893 description places the concert tunisien in a gas-lit café-like hall divided between a general audience and a raised platform occupied by musicians and dancers. More prominent patrons paid one franc for seats on the platform.

An 1894 account described a concert indigène near the avenue de la Marine in Tunis. The gas-lit hall was divided into two sections: one for the general public and another, raised platform for prominent patrons who paid one franc.

=== Dance ===
Dance was a principal component of the performances. Contemporary programmes and descriptions mention the "danse du ventre", "danse tunisienne", "danse algérienne", "danse kabyle", "danse du Maroc", "danse égyptienne", "danse circassienne", "danse du Soudan" and "danses d’almées". Mentioned in an 1893 account is the “dance of the handkerchiefs and the belly” (danse des mouchoirs et du ventre), performed by almées. The performances more generally featured "les danses les plus originales", accompanied by an "rythme oriental" and "pas pleins de langueur" ("languorous steps").

The dances could be performed as separate acts by individual or several members of a troupe. Some programmes also included larger ensemble numbers, such as the Grande Fantasia Arabe, performed by the entire troupe of Concert de Howas. Another show concluded with poses vivantes performed by the female members of the troupe of La Belle Fatma, representing the conquête de Tunis par la France. The travelling Concerts tunisiens associated with Justine Valck, featured the wrestler Mohammed Ben-Saïd, where he was described as a bel Arabe and as the troupe's leading performer.

=== Music ===
The musical accompaniment could involve a small ensemble. At the 1889 Paris Exposition, one contemporary description lists a piano, two violins, a mandolin and a guitar, with the accompaniment supplemented by the "tabourka" and "tar". The two percussion instruments were played by women. At the Tunisian Souk, the danses d’almées were accompanied by a European piano. An 1893 account described an ensemble consisting of a rebab, two violins, a bendaïr and a regg, played by Jewish musicians under the direction of a woman who also sat before a piano. The performance began with music that was described as monotonous but pleasing to the audience. A 1900 account describes musicians accompanied the performers on tambourines and drums, producing what the contemporary observer described as monotonous melody.

Singing could accompany the dancing. The 1889 description states that women sang plaintive refrains while a dancer performed the "danse du ventre". The 1891 programme of the concert des Howas additionally included the "Prière à Mahomet".

=== Costume ===
Costume was prominently described in accounts of the 1889 performances. The female dancers wore long blue or red skirts decorated with silver, with scarves, necklaces and bracelets. Female singers wore similar ornaments and wide silk trousers decorated with gold or silver bands. Another account described a female performer in a satin bodice covered with jewellery.

A 1890 description of the concerts tunisiens likewise describes female performers wearing an Algerian Jewish-style costume, a small Turkish cap, voluminous gauze trousers and Oriental silks, with decorated hair and orange blossoms. A 1900 description says women performed in light costumes decorated with sequins or imitation pearls.

In 1894 the woman directing the musicians wore a white silk casaque decorated with pink flowers and trousers embroidered in gold. The women collecting money from the audience were described as having hands stained red with henna.

A 1909 study described dancers at café-concerts tunisiens as performing barefoot and with the upper body exposed. The authors associated the performances with the danse du ventre, emphasizing movements of the hips and torso. The same work illustrated the subject with a figure captioned “La danse du ventre à l’Exposition de 1900” (“Belly dance at the 1900 Exposition”).

== Documented chronology ==
The following chronology records documented appearances of concerts tunisiens in contemporary sources, including fairs, theatres, and international exhibitions.

=== 1860s ===
1867 Paris Exposition

The term concerts tunisiens was already in use in connection with the 1867 Paris Exposition. Music critic Oscar Comettant described the musical entertainment at the 1867 Paris Exposition in his book "La Musique et les musiciens à l'Exposition internationale". The concerts tunisiens were among the exhibition's various musical attractions, alongside Chinese music concerts and performances by Gypsy and Hungarian orchestras. Comettant described the concert tunisiens as "si agaçants, si pittoresques et si étourdissants" ("so irritating, picturesque and dazzling") and grouped them among the exhibition's numerous "manifestations musicales".

=== 1870s ===
1878 Paris Exposition
At the 1878 Paris Exposition, there was only one small concert Tunisien present, near the Pont d'Iéna. A later account stated that, unlike the 1889 Exposition, the 1878 Exposition had not given as much space to the "élément exotique et pittoresque". It performed with a small orchestra and the principal musician was an Algerian man known as "Géant de Souze". His little daughter Rachel Eny (later known as La Belle Fatma) performed as well and her dance became a great succes.

=== 1880s ===
Exposition internationale de Nice
At the International Exhibition of Nice in 1883, a contemporary account described the concerts tunisiens as “inevitable” attractions in the exhibition park.

In April 1884, two concerts tunisiens were among the popular attractions at the Easter fair in Reims, alongside femmes torpilles, a femme oiseau, dioramas, and tirs.

Later in April 1884, an Easter fair, also known as the Quasimodo Fair, featured two concerts tunisiens, one of them explicitly identified as that of La Belle Fatma.

In October 1884, the concerts tunisiens were among the popular attractions at the Foire de Bordeaux on the Esplanade des Quinconces. A contemporary account noted that the concerts tunisiens “ont un succès considérable” (“were enjoying considerable success”). The first featured La Belle Fatma, the "colosse de Sousse" and other performers, while the second, directed by Lagneaux, presented Mademoiselle Mima. Both attracted large crowds; the account noted that spectators had to queue for the second establishment.

By April 1885 “Concert Tunisien — La belle Fatma Ben-Eny” was performing in Libourne for a few days after attracting large crowds at the Bordeaux fairs of October and March.

In November 1885, M. Lagneau, identified as director of the Concert tunisien, published a notice stating that La Belle Fatma was alive and performing successfully in Rouen, correcting reports that she had been killed in Arles.

From 1885 to 1886, the travelling booth ("la baraque ambulante") known as the Concerts tunisiens, operated by proprietor Justine Valck, appeared in contemporary newspapers. Multiple accounts stated that Valck's Concert tunisiens was known throughout the fairgrounds of southern France.

In January 1886, a contemporary account records the Concert Tunisien among the attractions on the Place Bretagne fairground, where La Belle Fatma performed "la danse Tunisienne", accompanied by several performers including the colosse de Sousse. The accompanying voices are also mentioned, as well as the low, melancholy cries of the colosse de Sousse.

Later in January 1886 a contemporary report on an upcoming fair in Alais announced that visitors would find “deux concerts Tunisiens” among its attractions.

In February 1886, two concerts Tunisiens were among the establishments at the New Year's fair at Épernay.

In March 1886 the Concert Tunisien was described as “splendidement organisé” under its director, M. Lagneau. La Belle Fatma was named as the star of the troupe.

A contemporary account from October 1886 reported that at the Neuilly fair, the Concert Tunisien attracted large crowds each evening, with particularly strong public interest in la belle Fathma. It further stated that Fathma subsequently had a booth within the Concert de Paris on the Champs-Élysées, where visitors continued to crowd the entrance of the Concert Tunisien each evening.

In December 1886, concerts tunisiens took place at the Eden Theatre in Paris, featuring La Belle Fatma.

By June 1887, the concert tunisien received negative criticism. One contemporary report described the concerts tunisiens ou arabes as featuring “imitation Fatmas” performing so-called characteristic dances to discordant music, concluding that what had once been novel had “become commonplace.”

A July 1887 account of the Foire de Neuilly writes of the triumph of the concerts Tunisiens. The concerts were described as "on a platform, young women, often pretty, accompanied by two or three bachi-bazouks, perform voluptuous dances to the accompaniment of an infernal music." The account also presented an origin story for the concert tunisien format. According to the article, Fatma had arrived in Paris with her family in 1878 and performed at the Moroccan pavilion of the 1878 Paris Exposition before travelling through the provinces. The article then credited Lagneau with discovering her and establishing what it called the “vrai concert tunisien”. At the Foire de Neuilly, Lagneau appeared with a troupe of Tunisian women including Mima, Aïcha and Genita, presented as new performers following the success of the celebrated Fatma.

In July 1887, the Neuilly fair featured four concerts tunisiens among its numerous attractions. Several contemporary accounts listed the concerts tunisiens as part of the fair's popular entertainment.

In August 1887, concerts tunisiens were among the popular attractions at the annual August fair, alongside the femmes torpilles. The contemporary account described the concerts tunisiens as being in the doldrums.

The Troupe du Concert Tunisien performed at the Royal Aquarium in 1887 featuring La Belle Fatma.

In February 1888 a contemporary report from Passy mentions a resident who had recently organized concerts tunisiens at his housewarming party in his courtyard late at night, alongside lively dances and Venetian farandoles. The report shows concerts tunisiens could also refer to entertainment organized in private settings, beyond the formal fairground.

1889 Paris Exposition

In July 1888, preparations for the Tunisian section of the 1889 Paris Exposition were described as including cafés, restaurants and concerts tunisiens within a reconstructed Tunisian environment featuring a bazaar, shops and displays of indigenous crafts.

At the 1889 Paris Exposition at the Rue du Caire, a concert Tunisien took place. The concerts tunisiens were associated with the exposition's broader presentation of an exoticized "Orient." A contemporary press account referred to the concerts tunisiens ou arabes as part of the spectacle of the Champ de Mars, alongside the Rue du Caire, the Tunisian and Algerian pavilions, and various colonial displays. The performances were presented as producing an "aigre et monotone mélopée" ("shrill and monotonous melody"), while a female performer was described as "a beloved woman with coal-black eyes, in a satin jacket, covered with jewellery". At the exposition, two concerts tunisiens and one concert algérian were established; one in the corner great bazaar surrounding the Grand Théâtre by La Belle Fatma, one at the Tunisian Souk and for the concert algérian the Rue de Caire had to be left. Another report mentions the cafés-concerts tunisiens on the Esplanade des Invalides, indicating that several such establishments operated there as part of the exhibition's commercial attractions. The concerts tunisiens on the Esplanade des Invalides attracted large crowds. Henry de Brisay reported that the public flocked to the village canaque, the sampang javanais, and the concerts tunisiens, algériens et arabes.

A contemporary report from the 1889 Paris Exposition provides a detailed description of the concerts tunisiens, which were situated near the Algerian concerts but were explicitly distinguished from them: “Les concerts tunisiens qui se trouvent près des concerts algériens diffèrent complètement de ceux-ci.” The attraction featured a raised stage with women and musicians seated on sofas, while female dancers wore long blue or red skirts decorated with silver, together with scarves, necklaces and bracelets. Female singers wore similar ornaments and wide silk trousers decorated with gold or silver bands. The report also describes the musical ensemble as consisting of a piano, two violins, a mandolin and a guitar, supplemented by tabourkas and tars, both played by women. During the performance, a dancer performed the danse du ventre while female singers performed “des refrains langoureux” in a plaintive style. The report further states that the attraction's tables, stools, lamps and cups were imported directly from Tunisia: “Tables, tabourets, lampes, tasses, tout vient directement de Tunisie.”

Another contemporary account described the “famous” concert tunisien was already associated with La Belle Fatma and presented it alongside the reconstructed souks and other Tunisian-themed attractions. A retrospective account published in April 1890 described the Concert tunisien among the exhibition's attractions and identified “la belle Fatma” as “de son vrai nom Rachel Bent-Eny” (“her real name Rachel Bent-Eny”), noting that she appeared there surrounded by her companions.

In several newspapers, the concerts Tunisiens et Algériens were listed among the paid "spectacles et plaisirs divers". They were not included with the ordinary admission ticket, and prices varied according to the seats occupied.

In January 1889, concert tunisiens was also present at a regional fairground in Bourges. The foires du Palais attracted large crowds.

=== 1890s ===
By July 1890 a description of the Saint-Clair fête listed concerts tunisiens among the attractions offered to visitors.

In September 1890, Concerts tunisiens were among the attractions of the September fair in Toulouse, held on the Allées Lafayette. The contemporary press listed them among the fair’s “spectacles forains”.

In November 1890, at the fair on the Haute-Plante in Pau, concerts tunisiens are listed among the established fairground attractions. The report describes these attractions collectively as a "un ensemble bariolé et cacophonique".

Moulin Rouge
In January 1891 a contemporary description of the Moulin Rouge lists the concerts tunisiens among the establishment’s principal attractions. It was staged inside the venue’s enormous white elephant, said to weigh 28,000 kg. The listing identifies René Valadon as director-manager.

At a fair in March 1891, the "concert des Howas" took place. The performers had been selected after the 1889 Paris Exposition from among the best artists of the concert Tunisien on the Rue du Caire.

By May 1891, concerts tunisiens were advertised as attractions within the fairground entertainment associated with international exhibitions. An account of the planned Exposition toulousaine internationale in Toulouse described a "kermesse permanente" (permanent fairground) and listed concerts tunisiens alongside carousels, shooting galleries and other amusements. The organizers stated that they had already received numerous requests for such attractions.

In August 1891, the concerts tunisiens were among the attractions at a large kermesse held at the Palais des Machines in Paris. The event attracted more than 5,000 visitors and was described as a miniature revival of the 1889 Paris Exposition. The concerts tunisiens were listed alongside "danses arabes" and other exhibitions.

In October 1891, two Concerts Tunisiens were presented at a fair in Rouen, one opposite the Rue Sainte-Marie and the other near the roller coasters. They were also known as concerts arabes. Both attractions featured belly dancers ("danseuses du ventre"), whose performances were described as a major reason for the crowds they attracted.

In the beginning of December 1891, an advertisement for the Éden-Concert announced the forthcoming debut of the troupe des Concerts Tunisiens as part of its programme.

In December 1891, the troupe du Concert-Tunisien performed during the intervals at the Folies-Bordelaises. The programme featured Fatma Eny.

In April 1892, concerts tunisiens et algériens were among the attractions drawing visitors to the Foire au pain d'épice in Paris: "des concerts tunisiens et algériens, une résurrection du harem de Sélika, attirent les badauds" ("Tunisian and Algerian concerts, a resurrection of Sélika's harem, attract onlookers"). Another newsreport from April 1892 also listed concerts tunisiens among the attractions at the Foire au pain d'épices around the Place de la Nation and Cours de Vincennes in Paris.

In October 1893, concerts tunisiens were among the attractions of the fair on the place Bretagne in Nantes. The description refers to “toute l’attraction mystérieuse des concerts tunisiens, marocains.”

Antwerp International Exposition (1894)
At the Antwerp International Exposition (1894), a "Quartier oriental" featured concerts tunisiens and performers described as “belles Fatmas”, alongside a reconstructed rue du Caire. The contemporary account remarked sarcastically that “the Belgians had made the Orient a sad place.”

By March and April 1894 at the Foire au pain d’épices concerts tunisiens ou algériens are listed among the fair’s established attractions.

In October 1894 Alfred Baraudon described visiting a concert indigène near the avenue de la Marine in Tunis. He wrote that such concerts, accompanied by dances by Jewish almées, took place almost everywhere in the city except the quartier maure.

In November 1894 the concerts tunisiens are listed among the attractions of the Saint-André fair in Mortagne. The report refers to them as more or less exotic ("plus ou moins exotiques").

By February 1896, concerts tunisiens had become an established form of popular entertainment in Tunis itself. A contemporary account noted that there were three such establishments in the city, specifically recommending them to "lovers of the belly dance" ("amateurs de la danse du ventre").

In May 1896, Léon Bessas, director of the Concert Cosmopolite, was directing another touring attraction, called la baraque (les concerts Tunisiens).

A 1897 description of Tunisian urban life listed concerts tunisiens among the street-level entertainments found alongside danses du ventre and puppet theatres, indicating that the term was also used for entertainment venues in Tunisia itself.

At the annual fair in Saint-Quentin in October 1897, concerts tunisiens were among the attractions, spectacles, parades and other fairground entertainments at the Boulevard Gambetta.

In January 1898, the "couple Oriol" were announced as "the hilarious performers of the concerts tunisiens" at the local Eden-Concert.

In April 1898, concerts tunisiens were among the attractions at the Easter fair, alongside museums, a snake charmer, shooting galleries and other fairground entertainments.

The perceived success of the concerts tunisiens influenced preparations for the Exposition universelle de 1900. In September 1898, during discussions about the Tahitian section, L. Brault argued for bringing Tahitian himene singers to Paris, noting that "all Paris had seen the concerts tunisiens" and that such spectacles had "certainly contributed to the success" of the 1889 Exhibition.

The Concerts tunisiens were reportedly an exception to the commercial failure of the theatres at the 1889 Paris Exposition. In preparation of the 1900 Paris Exposition a contemporary account stated that the Exhibition's theatres had ended in bankruptcy, “apart from the Concerts tunisiens,” suggesting their relative commercial success.

=== 1900s ===
In January 1900, in Verdun, an employment advertisement identified performers familiar with the genre as professionals with a specific skill, seeking “artistes arabes, nègres et femmes connaissant les danses de concerts tunisiens” for the Palais de Danse, directed by mister Detante.

1900 Paris Exposition

In February 1900, in the weeks before the 1900 Paris Exposition, contemporary commentary listed concerts tunisiens, algérians, javanais among the forthcoming attractions expected by the public.

A contemporary account of the 1900 Paris Exposition described the strong Parisian interest in foreign spectacles, exotic costumes and representations of distant countries, and referred specifically to the concerts tunisiens et algériens du Trocadéro. During an official visit to the Algerian Exhibition at the Trocadéro in April 1900, officials toured the "bazar de la rue de la Kasbah", the concerts tunisiens, and other installations.

Another notice of the concerts tunisiens at the Trocadéro identified Maurice Gribinski as secretary-general and featured the dancer Rosa and her “extraordinarily exotic” dances, alongside a large troupe.

At the 1900 Paris Exposition, the Rue d’Alger was presented as a successor to the famous Rue du Caire of the 1889 Exposition, where La Belle Fatma and her danse du ventre had attracted large crowds. The account describes the concerts tunisiens and the concerts algériens as spectacles that had been brought into fashion by the 1889 Paris Exposition. The performance included "danse du ventre" and "danse du sabre". Women performed in light costumes decorated with sequins or imitation pearls, while musicians accompanied them on tambourines and drums, producing what the contemporary observer described as monotonous melodies.

Another account of the 1900 Paris Exposition described concerts tunisiens operating on the Esplanade des Invalides alongside the Annamite theatre. A contemporary account reported that both gave “more or less continuous performances throughout the entire day.”

In June 1906, concerts tunisiens were mentioned alongside "les tentes marocaines" among the attractions at the fair. The "danse du ventre" was a success, and the promotional patter presented the dancers as stars of the Casino, Olympia, Folies-Bergère, etc. The dancers were also described as having exotic names, suggestive of Spain and Algeria. Spectators flocked to see them and returned bewildered by their abdominal and callipygian contortions. The same account described a "danse de l'arc-en-ciel" ("rainbow dance"), advertised as being highly regarded in Dahomey. The attraction had a drum for an orchestra.

By 1907, concerts tunisiens could also be associated with the fairground display of human curiosities. Lucien Nass recalled adwarf-like figure who had “long been exhibited” ("longtemps exhibé") in the concerts tunisiens des fêtes foraines.

A February 1909 report on the Cavalcade de Charité in Perpignan, a charitable carnival procession, describes a procession featuring various themed groups, including a depiction of Africa identified through the “déballage des concerts tunisiens” ("the presentation/display of concerts tunisiens").

Exposition Internationale de l'Est de la France
The official general report on the 1909 Exposition Internationale de l'Est de la France lists concerts tunisiens among the musical attractions at Parc Sainte-Marie, alongside brass bands, military music and other concerts.

=== 1910s ===
In September 1911 acontemporary account of a large fair described concerts tunisiens as fairground booths alongside danse du ventre attractions and other “exotic attractions” ("attractions exotiques").

== Establishments ==
Individual establishments of concerts tunisiens operated under different names and in various locations.

=== Le concert tunisien de la belle Fatma ===
A contemporary account traced the career of Rachel Bent-Eny, later known as "La Belle Fatma", to a small concert Tunisien near the Pont d'Iéna at the 1878 Paris Exposition. As a child of seven or eight, she was encouraged by her father, an Algerian musician known as the "Géant de Souze", to perform a dance inspired by the belly dance she had seen in Algiers. The performance became a popular attraction, and would help Fatma becoming an established performer.

At the October 1884 fair in Bordeaux, one of two Concerts Tunisiens operating side by side featured La Belle Fatma under new management. The account described her as "toujours admirablement belle et gracieuse" ("still remarkably beautiful and graceful") and identified the "colosse de Sousse" and other performers as part of the establishment. Their programme featured original dances accompanied by what the writer called the "rythme oriental" and "pas pleins de langueur"; the establishment was reportedly never empty.

In April 1885 an advertisement announced “Concert Tunisien — La belle Fatma Ben-Eny” in Libourne for a limited engagement. The advertisement noted her recent appearances at the October and March fairs in Bordeaux and stated that she had attracted audiences from across the city.

An November 1885 account identified M. Lagneau as the director and the Concert tunisien of La Belle Fatma as the best of the Concerts tunisiens.

By January 1886, a contemporary account placed “la belle Fathma” at the Concert Tunisien on the Place Bretagne, where she performed the "danse des Tunisiennes". The account describes her appearing with a woman who claimed to be her mother, the “colosse du Sousse”, and a Black male performer.

Following the Concert Tunisien at the Neuilly fair in 1886, "la belle Fathma" performed the Concert de Paris on the Champs-Elysées. Visitors allegedly crowded to see her Concert Tunisien.

In December 1886, concerts tunisiens was the advertised title of an attraction at the Eden Theatre in Paris featuring Fatma. The theatre's operating company had installed an "immense baraque" in the public foyer for the exhibition of the "belle Fatma", accompanied by her regular musicians.

Fatma also performed at the Royal Aquarium in 1887 as part of the Troupe du Concert Tunisien.

At the 1889 Paris Exposition, Fatma appeared successively at the Grand Théâtre, at one of the Moroccan tents on the Rue du Caire, and finally at a small establishment called the Concert Tunisien. The account described the venue as a tapestry-decorated room accommodating about fifty spectators, with Fatma seated on a raised, throne-like platform accompanied by her father the "colosse de Souze", several percussionists, three dancers and a piano player. Its programme consisted of an "danse algérienne", a "danse circassienne" and a "danse tunisienne", the latter performed by la belle Fatma.

=== Concerts tunisiens ===
Several newspapers in 1885 and 1886 report that Alexandre Scaptz (alternatively Scraps, Scalp or Alexandre-Gustave Scalp), a fairground strongman and Justine Valck (alternatively Valeck, Walck and Walk), met in Lyon in a booth where she performed as a femme-torpille. Scaptz took her with him and saved 2000 francs to purchase a travelling booth, which he gifted to Valck.

With this booth, the Concerts tunisiens was founded by Justine Valck. Several contemporary newspapers described Valck as a "danseuse orientale" working with itinerant troupes, owner of the travelling booth ("la baraque ambulante") known as the Concerts tunisiens. Another report mentions a makeshift "troupe de mauresques" of women, performing "danses excentriques". Justine is referenced as "pseudo-mauresque". It also reported that Valck subsequently gave performances at Arles with the wrestler Mohammed Ben-Saïd (alternatively Ben-Mohammed, Ben-Mahommed and Ben-Mohamed). He is mentioned as the troupe's leading performer and described as "bel Arabe". He is described as employed in the establishment, singing her romances "dans son langage d’Orient".

The establishment became the subject of extensive newspaper coverage following a sensational crime involving its owner. Scaptz, aged 41, from Metz, and Valck, aged 27, from Marseille, were in a relationship when he purchased the travelling booth for her. Their relationship later ended after Valck became involved with the wrestler Mohammed Ben-Saïd. In November 1885, Scaptz confronted her at the Esplanade du Marché Neuf in Arles where she was performing and fired four revolver shots at her as she left the Concerts Tunisiens. Valck survived after two months in hospital, while Scaptz was sentenced to four years in prison. An 1886 newspaper published a large part of Scaptz testimony in court.

Shortly before the incident, a source describes that they performed in Marseille at the Saint-Lazare fair.

=== le concert tunisien du Souk ===
A concert tunisien was also installed in the Tunisian Souk at the 1889 Paris Exposition. A contemporary reviewer considered it comparatively unremarkable. Its principal point of distinction, in his view, was the musical accompaniment: the "danses d'almées" were performed with a European piano, which he believed stripped the Arabic melodies of their distinctive character.

The pianist was identified as Bennini-Semmama, described by the reviewer as an Arab Jew. According to the account, his stay in Paris proved fatal: he fell ill and died in the final days of August 1889. The reviewer did not know who succeeded him.

The same source later described the fate of the establishment's furnishings after the Exposition. In December, the furniture of the Tunisian Souk concert was offered for sale at the Hôtel des Ventes on the rue Drouot. The material—described as including twelve mirrors, thirty-two lanterns, six divans, Turkish tables, hangings, flags, carpets, 100 stools and fifty guéridons—was sold for only 1,320 francs in total. The writer presented this dispersal as an ironic reversal of the concert's exhibition success, remarking that its furnishings produced a "singulier et misérable effet" when piled together in the auction yard.

=== Tente marocaine ===
Several contemporary accounts from March and April 1890 state that Baya Mathilde Akoun Bent-Eny, also named "La Belle Baya", followed in the footsteps of her cousin La Belle Fatma. Baya's father had served for four years as cashier of the troupe in which Fatma performed, while her mother had worked there as a pianist. Baya became the star of a troupe performing at the Tente marocaine, rue du Caire. After the 1889 Paris Exposition, the troupe moved to the Montagnes-Russes and later to the Village japonais, boulevard de Strasbourg.

=== Concert des Howas ===
At a fair in March 1891 the "concert des Howas" took place. The performers were described as having been selected after the 1889 Paris Exposition from among the best artists of the concert Tunisien on the Rue du Caire. Its programme contained Sidi-Mustapha performing the Danse de Pipwopilou, Sidi-Beb-Cader the Danse du Maroc, Mlle Jaura, described as a 12-year-old Tunisian girl the Danse Kabyle, and Mlle Aïchat, described as a young Moorish woman the Danse du Ventre. The entire troupe performed the Grande Fantasia Arabe, while the programme also included the Prière à Mahomet as performed in Arab mosques. Its programme contained several acts and performers later associated with the Concert Cosmopolite.

=== la troupe du Concert-Tunisien ===
In December 1891, a Bordeaux newspaper reported that la troupe du Concert-Tunisien performed during the intervals at the Folies-Bordelaises. The programme featured Fatma Eny in the "danse du Sérail de Tunis", followed by the "Danse algérienne" performed by Baya Adge-Kelil, the "Danse égyptienne" by Zora Kadour, the "Danse circassienne" by Aïcha Kedaouedje, and the "Danse du Soudan" by Sidi Yousef Rahman. The newspaper noted that the troupe would remain in Bordeaux only temporarily.

=== la baraque (les concerts Tunisiens) ===
By May 1896, Léon Bessas, director of the Concert Cosmopolite was directing another touring attraction, called "la baraque (les concerts Tunisiens)". A newspaper reports he was arrested for violating child-labour legislation after a 13-year-old girl named Brissand was exhibited at the establishment and performed the "danse du ventre". The girl was taken into police custody.

== Performers ==
Contemporary advertisements and newspaper reports describe the following performers in concerts tunisiens.

Performer	Stagename	Repertoire	Years	Source(s)
Baya Adge-Kelil	-	danse algérienne	1891	
Aïcha	-	almée	1887	
Aïchat	-	danse du ventre	1891	
Sidi-Beb-Cader	-	danse du Maroc	1891	
Mohammed Ben-Saïd (Ben-Mohammed, Ben-Mohamed)	l'Endymion africain	lutteur premier sujet de la troupe	1885 1886	
Brissand	-	danse du ventre	1896	
Couple Oriol	-	désopilants artistes	1898	
Yusef Eny	géant de Souze colosse de Souze (Sousse)	-	1878 1884 1886 1889	
Baya Mathilde Akoun Bent-Eny	la Belle Baya	-	1889 1890	
Rachel Eny (Fatma Eny)	la Belle Fatma	danse du Sérail de Tunis danse du ventre danse Tunisienne	1878 1885 1886 1887 1889 1891	
Fratelli	-	baryton	1912	
Genita	-	almée	1887	
Maurice Gribinski	-	sécrétaire général	1900	
Jaura	-	danse Kabyle	1891	
Zora Kadour	-	danse Égyptienne	1891	
Aïcha Kedaouedje	-	danse circassienne	1891	
Lagneau Lagneaux	-	direction découvrit et fonda le vrai concert tunisien	1884 1885 1886 1887	
Mima	-	almée	1884 1887	
Sidi-Mustapha	-	danse de Pipwopilou	1891	
Rosa	-	danses d'exotisme	1900	
Bennini-Semmama	-	piano	1889	
Spydo	-	comique	1933	
Justine Valck (Valeck, Walck, Walk)		propriétaire danseuse orientale danses excentriques	1885 1886	
Sidi Yousef Rahman	-	danse du Soudan	1891	

== Cultural reception ==
Contemporary references to concerts tunisiens reflect changing perceptions of the performances, including their musical, exotic, popular, and commercial aspects.

=== 1880s ===
In July 1886, the Vincennes festival in the Bois de Vincennes featured concerts tunisiens among its fairground attractions. The contemporary report noted that the concerts tunisiens “were fashionable at the moment” (“ils sont à la mode en ce moment”).

By June 1887, the concerts tunisiens had become a familiar form of entertainment at the suburban fairs around Paris. A contemporary satirical account remarked that the fairs now offered “thirty-three” smiling Belles Fatmas, jokingly describing a succession from Mima after Fatma and Zulma after Mima. The writer also drew attention to the recurring presence of a “père Fatma” on the stage, presented as part of the familiar family and performance structure of the attraction. The account portrays the concerts tunisiens as a standardised genre, in which names, roles and stage conventions were repeatedly reproduced at different suburban fairs.

A contemporary description of the concerts tunisiens at the 1889 Paris Exposition combined detailed observations of costumes, music and performance with strongly exoticised characterisations. One report described the performers' Arabic songs as supposedly obscene while explicitly acknowledging that the writer did not understand Arabic: “N’entendant pas la langue arabe, nous ignorons ce qu’elles disent, mais il paraît que leurs paroles sont d’une obscénité révoltante.”

A May 1889 account of the 1889 Paris Exposition compared an Egyptian performance in the Rue du Caire directly with the concerts tunisiens et algériens at the Esplanade des Invalides. The writer observed that the performance "cela ressemble fort au spectacle des concerts tunisiens et algériens".

In July 1889, a contemporary commentary placed the concerts tunisiens within a broader French fascination with representations of the "Orient". The writer grouped them with almées and other attractions of the Rue du Caire, and described the "danse du ventre" as a "pas épouvantable" ("dreadful step"), presented to audiences as voluptuous. The passage also criticized the tendency to view foreign countries through preconceived and stereotyped images.

Another July 1889 account, also represents the concerts tunisiens as part of a wider Parisian fascination with an imagined “Orient.” A contemporary commentary acknowledged that French views of foreign countries were generally “assez faux” (“rather false”), while recalling the public's enthusiasm for concerts tunisiens, almées, the Rue du Caire and the “danse du ventre.”

In November 1889, a contemporary commentary on a beauty contest invoked the concerts Tunisiens of the Foire de Neuilly as a familiar point of comparison. The article referred to them as “les concerts tunisiens de la fête de Neuilly” and jokingly proposed the name “concert universel” for the beauty contest.

=== 1890s ===
In 1890 Jean Lorrain gives a detailed account of the fête de Neuilly, framed by a broader cynical nostalgia for older fairground traditions and a sharp critique of contemporary spectacle and its manufactured exoticism. He writes about the concerts tunisiens as a standardized fairground attraction, claiming that they offered numerous smiling "Fatmas or Mimas" and repeatedly stresses their uniformity. The female performers appeared under recurring names such as Fatma, Mima, Zulma and Féridgé. Their appearance was described as consisting of ink-blue hair, braided with imitation sequins and orange blossoms, an Algerian Jewish costume, a small Turkish velvet cap, voluminous gauze trousers and Oriental silks. Their performance included "le pas du shall", accompanied by the "derbourka", described as "monotonous and shrill". The description also included a male attendant in a fez, playing a waltz on a Pleyel piano. On the stage was the recurring figure whom the writer mockingly calls "le même père Fatma", a male proprietor figure. The account portrays the concert tunisiens as a recognizable format.

By March 1890, the concerts tunisiens had become part of the continuing debate over the “exotic” spectacles that remained popular after the 1889 Paris Exposition. A contemporary commentator complained that, after six months of exhibition at the Champ de Mars and the Esplanade des Invalides, such attractions continued to spread into Parisian entertainment venues, where the "danse du ventre" was prominently advertised and presented in imitation of the almées who had performed in booths in the Rue du Caire. The writer described the performances in terms of gestures, postures and movements of the belly, hips and buttocks, but condemned them as “pornographic choreography”, reflecting the moral criticism directed at their presentation.

A January 1891 travel account recalled the music of the concerts tunisiens at the Paris Exposition while describing the streets of Pollensa in Mallorca. The writer compared the drawn-out, nasal melodies heard in Pollensa with those performed by the concerts tunisiens ou morocains at the Exposition.

A 1892 reminiscence from Rouen places Concerts Tunisiens among popular fairground attractions like tirs, femmes-colosses and femmes-torpilles. The author recalls "des Fathma plus ou moins authentiques," who introduced audiences to the attractions of the "danse du ventre".

A 1892 theatrical review, discussing the use of the tambourine in Massenet's Hérodiade, remarked that the instrument had been "popularized by the concerts tunisiens". The writer associated its rhythm with the movement of a camel in the desert.

In 1894 Alfred Baraudon's account was critical of the performance. He described the dances as "danses sans caractère", the performers as "almées d'occasion", and the venue as a "beuglant de barrière habillé à la turque".

A satirical article of October 1895 used the performers of the concerts tunisiens as a metaphor for people vocally encouraging the "belles Fatmas".

By September 1899, critics were explicitly associating the spread of concerts tunisiens with the success of the 1889 Paris Exposition. One contemporary commentary claimed that, after the Exposition, an “army of beautiful Fatmas” had spread throughout France and that tents appeared at public festivities in towns and villages, where performances were presented under the label of concerts tunisiens. The article condemned these spectacles as sexually provocative and expressed concern that the 1900 Paris Exposition might leave a similar legacy.

=== 1900s ===
By January 1900, the concerts tunisiens and “belles Fathmas” had become familiar symbols. François Coppée invoked them as distractions from political affairs, referring to spectators being “deafened by the din of the Tunisian concerts” and “dazzled by the almond-shaped eyes of the beautiful Fathmas.”

By April 1900, a contemporary article mocking the 1900 Paris Exposition complained of “concerts tunisiens that have been dragged everywhere” ("des concerts tunisiens qui ont traîné partout"), alongside performers described sarcastically as “natives from Montmartre and La Villette.”

Later in April 1900, a report from Toulouse described residents of the Allées Lafayette as being subjected twice a year to the “uproar of the concerts tunisiens” ("tumulte des concerts tunisiens") and awaiting the return of these “noisy exhibitions” ("bruyantes exhibitions") with apprehension.

In July 1900 an account reflects a strongly critical contemporary reception. The author regarded concerts tunisiens and concerts algériens as spectacles that had been popularized by the 1889 Exposition but had by 1900 “had their day,” describing them in explicitly derogatory and racialized terms and characterizing the performances as vulgar rather than genuinely immoral.

In November 1900, contemporary commentary compared the attractions of the Exposition with those of French fairgrounds in Le Havre and Rouen, citing the concerts tunisiens and Montmartre "danses du ventre" among the spectacles seen by visitors.

In December 1900, a review of a Sainte-Cécile concert at the Grand Théâtre associated the rough rhythms of Grieg's Second Norwegian Dance with the concerts tunisiens. The critic attributed the audience's enthusiasm partly to "l'originalité des rythmes rauques qui font involontairement songer aux concerts tunisiens" ("the originality of the rough rhythms which involuntarily bring the concerts tunisiens to mind").

In a May 1902 review of the vaudeville "Papa veut un artiste", performed at the Théâtre Cluny, described a scene set in Barbizon in which artists' apprentices sang and performed various dances, including the polka, farandole and danse du ventre, before imitating "the noisy cacophony of the concerts tunisiens."

In September 1902, a review of Camille Saint-Saëns's "Parysatis" likewise used concerts tunisiens as a familiar point of reference for musical and choreographic features associated with Tunisia. The reviewer described Saint-Saëns's use of "intervalles augmentés ou diminués" as "souvenirs évidents des concerts tunisiens et de leurs danses du ventre" ("obvious memories of the Tunisian concerts and their belly dances"). The same review referred to a characteristic percussion accompaniment, writing that "au concert tunisien c'est toujours un nègre qui tape comme un sourd sur une sorte de tambour" ("at the Tunisian concert it is always a Black man who beats deafeningly on a kind of drum").

In the beginning of October 1904, L. G. Dyonet described the sound of concerts tunisiens as "énervants ronflements de tambourins" ("irritating rumblings of tambourines"), placing them within the noisy and visually crowded atmosphere of the fair.

Later in October 1904, commentator Louis Decroix grouped the concerts tunisiens explicitly among other fairground attractions: "I understand no more the fairground attractions, little theatrical shows, concerts tunisiens, halls of mirrors, upside-down manor houses, or other phantasmagorias at a celebration of labour."

By August 1905, a report on the annual fair in Sedan stated that “the era of the femmes sauvages and concerts tunisiens had passed,” indicating that the concert tunisien was increasingly regarded as a bygone form of fairground entertainment.

=== 1910s ===
A 1912 literary account describes Mina, known as "l'Africaine", as a travelling performer who appeared at Concerts tunisiens during the summer fairs (vogues). Mina is said to perform a "danse kabyle" which she had learned in the "caboulots de Marseille". The account also refers disparagingly to Mina's performance as involving "la danse kabyle avec les deux mouchoirs et les sous des vieux", a Kabyle dance performed with two handkerchiefs, for which older spectators gave her money.

In March 1913, concerts tunisiens remained a recognizable reference point for Orientalist entertainment. A report from Poitiers described an acrobat performing an “Oriental” sequence of belly dancing, Tunisian Fatmas and Cairo dancers; the accompanying sounds, including percussion and shouted “Aïa! Aïa! Aïa!”, were said to resemble the castanets and distinctive melodies often heard in concerts tunisiens.

In August 1913, Antonin Baratier wrote that the almées, “even those of the Concerts Tunisiens, were still very beautiful at the age of twenty-five.

By December 1913, concerts tunisiens was grouped with "les baraques de la danse du ventre" and other "attractions exotiques." The spectacle is simultaneously praised as "ingenious," "artistic," and "truly beautiful in places," yet condemned as "lamentable" and ephemeral.

=== 1920s ===
In September 1922, a reference to the "concerts tunisiens de Bab-Saadoun" appeared in a discussion of Algerian workers in metropolitan France. The phrase placed the concerts tunisiens specifically in the context of Bab Saadoun in Tunis, alongside fondouks, Moorish cafés and other nocturnal North African establishments: "on se croirait dans les fondouks de Tlemcen, dans la kasbah d'Alger, dans le quartier de la rue Bleue de Constantine ou dans les concerts tunisiens de Bab-Saadoun."

== Concert Algérien ==
Often mentioned in the same breath are the concerts algériens.

At the 1889 Paris Exposition, alongside concerts tunisiens and concerts marocains the concerts algériens took place. A contemporary account describes its programme as consisting of "danses mauresques, ouled-naïls, kabyles et nègres, dirigées par trois orchestres." The reviewer was highly critical of the stereotyped presentation of the "danse du ventre", which he regarded as an overused feature of the exhibition's representations of North Africa. He nevertheless singled out several performers and acts for praise.

Among them was Torkia, a fourteen-year-old Kabyle dancer described as "toute mignonne et toute charmante". With bare arms and sequins on her cheeks, she performed a danse des épées with what the reviewer called "une grâce et une crânerie délicieuses". Another woman performed the same type of dance in a markedly different style, rapidly turning while manipulating two curved swords, placing their points successively against her arms, chest, neck and even eyes. The writer described this performance as "vraiment curieux, intéressant et original" and "saisissant".

The programme also included "danses d'almées", accompanied by music and sometimes singing. The reviewer found the dances of Black men and women "grotesques sans le vouloir" and characterized them as an example of "étrangeté vulgaire", while praising the accompanying Arabic songs as "savoureuses et pittoresques". One performer accompanied herself on the kouitra, described as an Oriental lute. Overall, the Concert Algérien was judged to possess genuine interest and originality, although the account reflects the period's exoticizing and racialized language and its tendency to judge performers according to contemporary Parisian expectations of "authenticity".

Another contemporary 1889 source describes the concert algérien as an café-concert algérien, with Arabic songs accompanied by a deep, rhythmic sound produced by striking a stretched skin in time. Inside this establishment Algerian dancers performed, identified as famous "Ouled-Naïls, with their fingernails and hands stained by henna." The entrance to this concert was located at the end of a reproduction of an Algerian street, producing "a rather picturesque effect."
