= La Belle Fatma =

Algerien dancer in the Belle Époque in France (1868–1913)

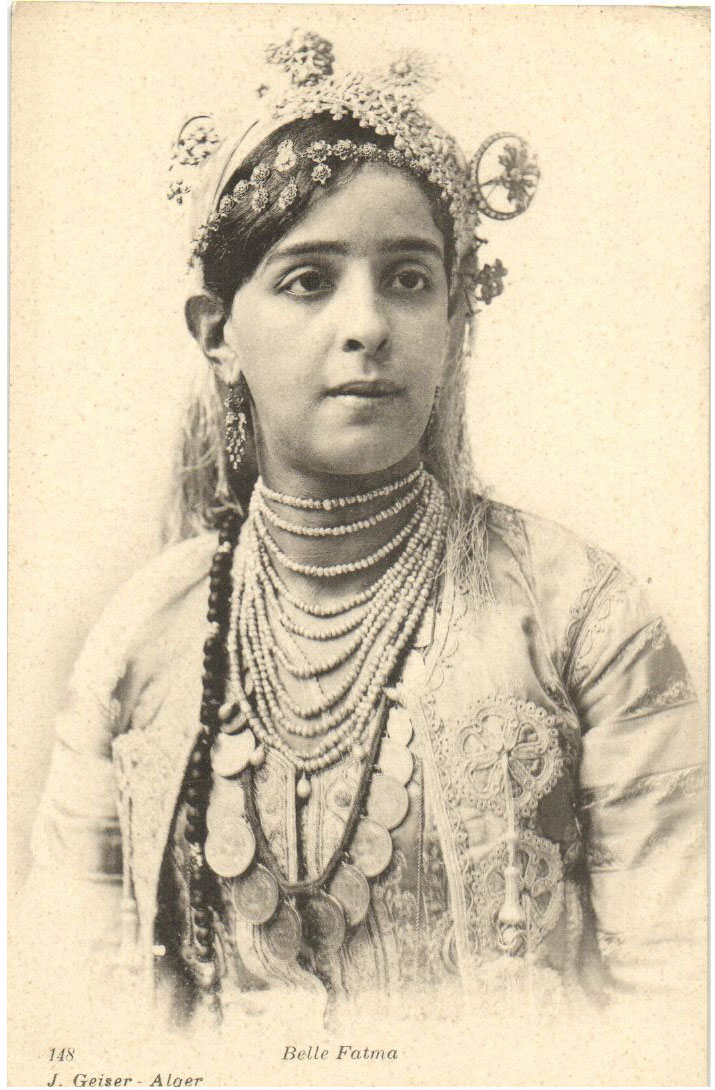
- Born: Rachel Eny; 29 January 1868; Algiers
- Died: 4 September 1913 (aged 45); 4th arrondissement of Paris, France
- Other names: Fatma Eny; Fathma Eny; Fatma Ben-Eny; Fatma Ben-Eni; Rachel Bent-Eny; La Belle Fathma; La Belle Tunisienne
- Occupation: dancer
- Known for: Concert Tunisien; 1878 Paris Exposition; 1889 Paris Exposition; 1900 Paris Exposition
- Parent: Yusef Eny (father)
- Relatives: David Eny (grandfather); Rachel Eny (grandmother); Rachel Eny (aunt); Samuel Eny (uncle); Aziza Eny (aunt); Baby Eny (uncle); Sarah Eny (aunt); Chabah Eny (aunt); Baya Mathilde Akoun Bent-Eny (cousin); Gradoudja Akoun Bent-Eny (cousin)

Rachel Eny, known by the stage name La Belle Fatma, was an Algerian dancer during the Belle Époque in France.

== Family background ==
Fatma's family is traced back to David Eny, a respected Jewish diamond merchant in Algiers, who was described as a prominent and reputable member of the city's commercial community.

David Eny and his wife Rachel had a large family, including Samuel, Baby, Sarah, Aziza, Chabah and Yusef. The family lived in Algiers on Rue Juba, where David maintained both a commercial premises and a family residence. The household was described as relatively prosperous and socially well connected.

David's sons Samuel and Baby subsequently succeeded him in business and expanded the family's commercial activities into jewelry. They established a prominent jewelry store in Algiers, later fitting out a larger establishment on Rue Bab-Azoun with furnishings brought from Paris.

Fatma was the daughter of Yusef Eny, the youngest son of David and Rachel. Yusef developed an interest in music from an early age. His mother reportedly bought him a violin when he was a child, and he learned melodies associated with the Jewish and Muslim musical traditions of Algiers. In 1848 he performed La Marseillaise on the instrument.

== Early life ==
Around 1876, Fatma came to France with her family, to perform concerts arabes. She was a little girl who accompanied the musicians.

By the time of the 1878 Paris Exposition, Yusef Eny was associated with musical performances presented as "Moorish" or Arab entertainment. One of the female performers in this setting was his daughter Fatma.

After the success of the exposition, her family remained in France, acquired two saltimbanque wagons, and travelled from town to town with a piano and baraque.

It is subsequently described that Yusef became involved in promoting his daughter as a public performer.

“The first years were not brilliant; but little by little Fathma became a woman, her beauty revealed itself and the ten-sou coins began to rain down.”

— Mémorial de la Loire et de la Haute-Loire, 5 August 1886

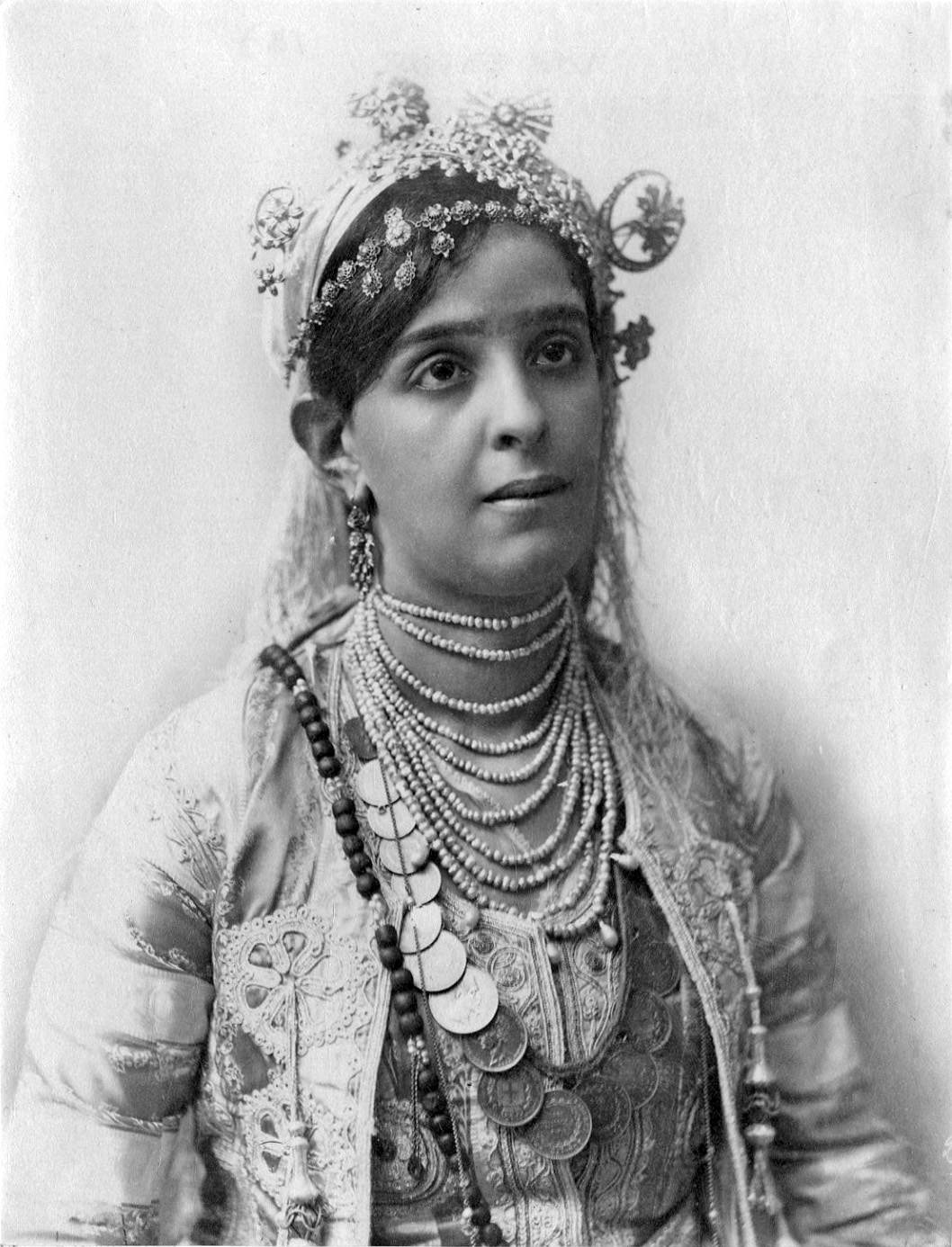
La Belle Fatma

== Career ==
=== 1870s ===
1878 Paris Exposition

According to the French theatre historian Arthur Pougin, Rachel Eny first attracted public attention as a child at the 1878 Paris Exposition. At the time, a small concert Tunisien was situated near the Pont d'Iéna. Pougin described its principal musician as a large Algerian man known as the “Géant de Souze” (“Giant of Souze”), who was Rachel's father. During the exhibition, he reportedly encouraged his seven- or eight-year-old daughter to dance for the visitors. Having been impressed by the “danse du ventre” (belly dance) she had seen in Algiers, the child imitated it, initially “somewhat awkwardly, without putting any particular intention into it”. According to Pougin, the performance proved highly popular: she received numerous caresses, coins and even silver pieces, and repeated the dance daily, sometimes several times a day. Pougin identifies the child by her real name as “Rachel Bent-Eny” and states that she later became known to the public as “la belle Fatma”.

Another account also describes Fathma Eny appearing at the 1878 Paris Exposition as part of a musical performance presented as a "Moorish" café. She was accompanied by other Algerian women who performed traditional songs, while her father Yusef Eny accompanied the singers on the violin. The account identifies Fathma as Yusef's daughter and presents the 1878 exhibition as the beginning of her emergence as a public attraction in Paris.

Yet another account published that a young woman named Fatma came to Paris with her family in 1878 and performed at the Moroccan pavilion of the 1878 Paris Exposition.

=== 1880s ===
Following the exposition, Yusef Eny continued presenting his daughter's performances in Paris. An account states that he rented premises on the Avenue de l'Opéra, where Arab-style musical performances continued for a period after the exhibition. Fathma subsequently became part of a touring entertainment enterprise managed by her father.

After the Paris performances, Yusef Eny undertook a European tour with Fathma, beginning in Brussels. The tour continued through several European capitals, although not all of the cities are identified. By the end of the European tour, Fathma was being presented in collaboration with various entertainers and fairground performers.

In April 1884, La Belle Fatma performed at an Easter fair, also known as the Quasimodo Fair, as part of one of the two present concerts tunisiens.

At the October 1884 fair in Bordeaux, one of two Concerts Tunisiens operating side by side featured La Belle Fatma under new management. The account described her as "toujours admirablement belle et gracieuse" ("still remarkably beautiful and graceful") and identified the "colosse de Sousse" and other performers as part of the establishment. Their programme featured original dances accompanied by what the writer called the "rythme oriental" and "pas pleins de langueur"; the establishment was reportedly never empty.

In April 1885, Fatma was performing in Libourne, where her concert tunisien was advertised as “la belle Fatma Ben-Eny.” The advertisement stated that she had attracted audiences from across Bordeaux during the October and March fairs and urged local residents of Libourne to hurry to see her before her engagement ended.

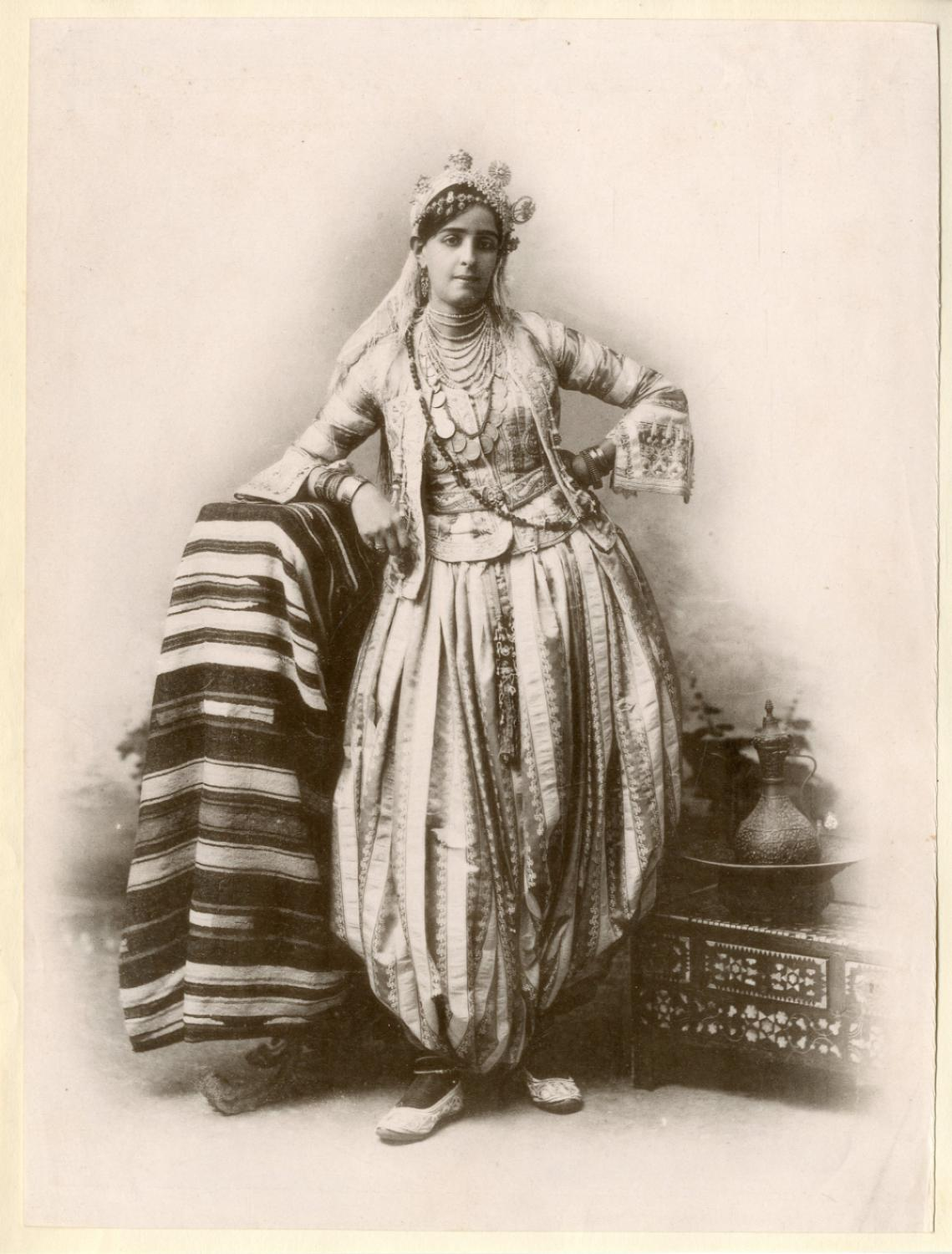
La Belle Fatma, ca. 1890

In the spring of 1885, Fatma performed at the fêtes du Jardin de Tuileries which allegedly brought her popularity to its height. Offers came to her from various theatres in Paris and London, for the latter she was offered a salary of five thousand francs a month.

After subsequently travelling, she was reportedly discovered by a man named Lagneau, who established what an article called the “vrai concert tunisien”.

In November 1885, M. Lagneau, director of the Concert tunisien, published a notice stating that La Belle Fatma was alive and performing successfully in Rouen, correcting reports that she had been killed in Arles.

By January 1886, a contemporary account placed “la belle Fathma” at the Concert Tunisien on the Place Bretagne, where she performed the "danse des Tunisiennes". The account describes her appearing with a woman who claimed to be her mother, the “colosse du Sousse”, and a Black male performer.

“We shall not attempt to describe here the beauty of the beautiful Fathma, whose face, says one of our colleagues, radiates an eternal and unalterable serenity.”

— Le Défenseur de la liberté, 2 January 1886

In March 1886, "la belle Fathma" was described as the star of the Concert Tunisien directed by M. Lagneau in Bordeaux.

By September 1886 a contemporary fairground report described La Belle Fathma, nicknamed the “Reine de beauté”, at her booth. She personally intervened when two journalists were asked to pay for admission and invited them to examine her physical appearance, telling them that they could give her publicity in their newspapers.

In November 1886, the Berlin impresario Freiherr von Schirp arranged her an engagement in Berlin.

In December 1886, concerts tunisiens was the advertised title of an attraction at the Eden Theatre in Paris featuring Rachel Eny. The theatre's operating company had installed an “immense baraque” in the public foyer for the exhibition of the “belle Fatma”, accompanied by her regular musicians. For the same show she was advertised alternatively as "la Belle Fathma Bent-Eny". Fathma was also performing at the Jardin de Paris. Articles describe her as one of the attractions presented to the public and emphasized the visual and exoticized manner in which she was marketed.

At the end of December 1886, "La Belle Fathma" was announced as one of the attractions at forthcoming charity festivities for victims of flooding in southern France. The festivities were to be held at the hippodrome and the palais de l’Industrie in Paris.

Foire de Neuilly

A contemporary account of the Foire de Neuilly described Fatma as having achieved considerable success there, attracting the attention of directors of fairground attractions, public gardens, and open-air theatres.

"La Belle Fathma" was the victim of a substantial theft during the fair. The receipts from several days were stolen, along with a revolver to which she was particularly attached.

Another contemporary account of the Fête de Neuilly observed that “les concerts tunisiens sont nombreux” and described their dancers as performing “à l'instar de la belle Fatma”.

By 1887 Parisians had come to admire “la belle Fatma”, an article describing her as “la plus jolie femme du monde” and distinguishing her from imitators performing with Lagneau at the Neuilly fair.

Following the Neuilly fair, Fatma performed the Concert de Paris on the Champs-Elysées. Visitors allegedly crowded to see her Concert Tunisien.

“Fathma’s beautiful eyes have secured the success.”

— La Tribune du Midi illustrée, 10 October 1886

Fatma also performed at the Royal Aquarium in 1887 as part of the Troupe du Concert Tunisien.

In October 1888, the Berlin directors Dorn and Baron offered Mlle Fatma-Ben-Eny 2,000 francs for a performance scheduled for 5 January 1889 there, together with travel and accommodation for two people. The account states that Fatma rejected the offers despite their being renewed.

1889 Paris Exposition

In 1889 La Belle Fatma returned to the 1889 Paris Exposition where, according to Pougin, her previous success made an appearance seem almost inevitable. She performed at several locations during the exposition. She appeared first at the Grand Théâtre de l'Exposition in early June, before the Gitanas of Granada became one of its major attractions. She subsequently appeared, according to Pougin, at one of the two Moroccan tents on the Rue du Caire, before establishing herself near the Gitanas in the bazaar surrounding the Grand Théâtre, in a small establishment.

Pougin described seeing her at the small establishment called the Concert Tunisien. He gave a detailed description of the venue and its performers. The room, decorated with tapestries, was small enough to accommodate approximately fifty spectators, many of whom had to remain standing. La Belle Fatma occupied a raised position at the back of the stage, seated before a large mirror and holding a tambourine. Her father, whom Pougin again called the “colosse de Souze”, performed beside her on a stringed instrument. The ensemble also included several percussionists and dancers, as well as a Tunisian pianist living in the Batignolles district of Paris.

According to Pougin, the approximately twelve-minute programme consisted of three dances: a “danse algérienne”, described by him as a stylised or imitation belly dance; a “danse circassienne”, presented as a sword dance; and a “danse tunisienne”, performed by La Belle Fatma herself. The admission price was one franc for civilians, soldiers and children's nurses. Pougin remarked that the Tunisian dance could be repeated several times a day without apparently exhausting its performer.

Another contemporary 1889 account described the “famous” concert tunisien was already associated with La Belle Fatma and presented it alongside the reconstructed souks and other Tunisian-themed attractions. A retrospective account published in April 1890 described the Concert tunisien among the exhibition's attractions and identified “la belle Fatma” as “de son vrai nom Rachel Bent-Eny” (“her real name Rachel Bent-Eny”), noting that she appeared there surrounded by her companions.

A 1900 account retrospectively identifies La Belle Fatma as one of the attractions of the 1889 Exposition, stating that “la Belle Fatma et sa danse du ventre firent courir tous les badauds” (“La Belle Fatma and her belly dance drew crowds of curious spectators”). It presents her as emblematic of the Tunisian-concert and belly-dance spectacles associated with the 1889 Exhibition.

=== 1890s ===
La Belle Fatma, 1890

Several March and April 1890 accounts state that Baya Mathilde Akoun Bent-Eny, also named la Belle Baya, followed in her first cousins Fatma's footsteps. Baya's father had served for four years as the cashier and her mother had worked as a pianist of la Belle Fatma's troupe. Baya received lessons from her cousin Fatma. Baya herself became the star of a troupe that performed at "la Tente marocaine de la rue du Caire". Baya's entire family danced alongside her among which was her brother Gradoudja.

In December 1891, a Bordeaux newspaper reported that la troupe du Concert-Tunisien performed during the intervals at the Folies-Bordelaises. The programme featured Fatma Eny in the “danse du Sérail de Tunis”, followed by the “Danse algérienne” performed by Baya Adge-Kelil, the “Danse égyptienne” by Zora Kadour, the “Danse circassienne” by Aïcha Kedaouedje, and the “Danse du Soudan” by Sidi Yousef Rahman. The newspaper noted that the troupe would remain in Bordeaux only temporarily.

In 1892, Fatma Eny was personally known to Bordeaux writer Jean Des Graulges, who described her as “universally known” as La Belle Tunisienne. He recalled meeting her in La Bastide and described the popularity she had achieved at Bordeaux’s March and October fairs. In her early years there, she occupied a booth along one of the fairgrounds, and the passage leading to it became known as the “Alley of Beautiful Women”. The writer stated that many women from Bordeaux visited her repeatedly during each fair and recorded Fatma’s appreciation of the warm reception she had received there from the city’s residents, particularly its women.

== In popular culture ==
The illustrator Georges Méliès depicted Fatma in a humorous drawing of fairground types, titled "La belle Fathma - types forains, [dompteuse, aboyeur et Fathma]".

L’Aube Illustrée listed both an engraving and a text article on La Belle Fathma in issue no. 54, dated 10 October 1886. On the same date Le Moniteur du Puy-de-Dôme illustré featured a portrait of La Belle Fathma on its middle pages.

Benjamin Constant allegedly asked Fatma to pose in his studio and he made her into a "Salomé". His painting was said to be exhibited at the Salon, sold for 20,000 francs and acquired by a Russian painter. A source states that Benjamin Constant did not care to see his name circulating through the fairs and forbid to mention the association.

The sculptor Antonin Mercié was said to have considered using Fatma as a model for a female figure, although it is not established that he actually did so.

In a 1929 retrospective on Toulouse-Lautrec’s paintings for La Goulue’s fairground booth, André Warnod recalled that the large compositions depicted a world including the Moulin Rouge dancers, La Goulue and La Belle Fatma. He described a separate painting of La Belle Fatma as a work in which Toulouse-Lautrec created a “symphony of vivid and fresh tones.” The person on the right on "La Danse Mauresque" is mentioned as La Belle Fatma.

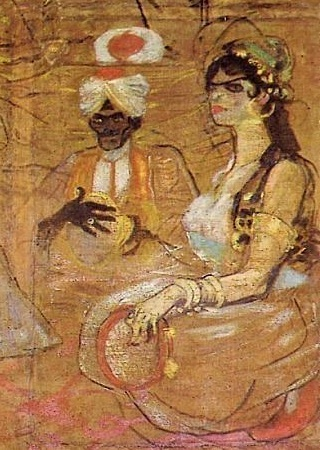
Detail of La Danse mauresque (1895), one of the panels from Henri de Toulouse-Lautrec's Décor de la baraque de la Goulue
