= Concert Cosmopolite =

19th-century Oriental-themed touring dance and songs entertainment from France

- Founded: c. 1890
- Founders: Léon Bessas
- Headquarters: France
- Members: Emma Saïd Ben Mohamed

The Concert Cosmopolite was a touring entertainment troupe active in the 1890s in France. Directed by Léon Bessas, it presented dance, songs and prayers to audiences, with programmes inspired by the popularity of exotic-themed displays at the 1889 Paris Exposition.

== History ==
An earlier precursor to the Concert Cosmopolite appeared at a fair in 1891 as the "concert des Howas". The performers were described as having been selected after the 1889 Paris Exposition from among the best artists of the “Concert Tunisien” on the Rue du Caire. Its programme already contained several elements later associated with the Concert Cosmopolite: Sidi-Mustapha performed the Danse de Pipwopilou, Sidi-Beb-Cader the Danse du Maroc, Mlle Jaura, described as a 12-year-old Tunisian girl the Danse Kabyle, and Mlle Aïchat, described as a young Moorish woman the Danse du Ventre. The entire troupe performed the Grande Fantasia Arabe, while the programme also included the Prière à Mahomet as performed in Arab mosques.

The Concert Cosmopolite, drew on the contemporary fascination with exoticism, presenting performers through stylized representations of non-European cultures. In February 1892, the director of Concert Cosmopolite Léon Bessas described in a newspaper what his aim was with the company. He wanted to present what contemporary publicity called "principaux types de races exotiques" ("principal types of exotic peoples"), explicitly linking the show's appeal to the success of exotic-themed displays at the 1889 Paris Exposition. Their performance consisted of dances, songs and prayers accompanied by piano music.

The Concert Cosmopolite operated within the broader world of nineteenth-century fairground entertainment. In April 1892 at the Palm Sunday fair in Bar-sur-Aube, it was allocated a site at the Rond-Point du faubourg de Belfort alongside other attractions. The Concert cosmopolite itself was listed as consisting of Zora, Aïcha, Mima-Ben-Saïd, Sidi-Mustapha and Si-Ben-Kadour. In April 1892, a newspaper in Chaumont listed it among the attractions installed on the Place du Champ-de-Mars. The Concert Cosmopolite was described as a “charming establishment” that had enjoyed considerable success wherever it had appeared. Its "Oriental" performance consisted of several dances, including the "dance du ventre" which was described enjoying such success at the 1889 Paris Exposition.

By May 1896, Léon Bessas, 48 years old, was directing another touring attraction, called "la baraque (les concerts Tunisiens)". A newspaper reports he was arrested for violating child-labour legislation after a 13-year-old girl named Brissand was exhibited at the establishment and performed the "danse du ventre". The girl was taken into police custody.

In May 1898, Léon Bessas was still named as the director of concert cosmopolite.

== Repertoire ==
=== Dances ===
- danse Kabile

This dance was performed by Mlle Zora in 1982. Alternatively named "danse Kabyle", this was featured on their 1892 programme performed by Mlle Zora. "Danse Kabyle" was also mentioned in an 1892 newspaper report.

- danse des Almées

This dance was performed by Mlle Aïcha in 1982. It was mentioned in an 1892 review. This was featured on their 1892 programme performed by Mlle Aïcha. It was also mentioned in an 1892 newspaper report.It was also featured in an 1893 review.

- danse du BerBer

This dance was performed by Mlle Mima-Ben Saïd in 1982. This was featured on their 1892 programme performed by Mlle Mima-Ben-Saïd. Alternatively spelled "danse du Berber", it was also featured in an 1893 review.

- danse du Pilou-Pilou

This dance was performed by M. Sidi-Mustapha in 1982. This was featured on their 1892 programme performed by M. Sidi-Mustapha.

- danse Mauresque

This dance was performed by M. Sidi-Ben-Kadour in 1982. This was featured on their 1892 programme performed by M. Sidi-Ben-Kadour.

- danse du ventre

Described in a 1892 review as "that strange innovation which drew all Paris to the Rue du Caire at the Universal Exposition." Also mentioned in another 1892 review. It was also mentioned in an 1892 newspaper report, describing it as famous and very successful at the 1889 Paris Exposition.Highlighted as the "supreme attraction" in 1893, was the "celebrated and suggestive" danse du ventre.

- danse du Sabbat

This was also featured in an 1893 review.

=== Songs and prayers ===
- chant Mauresque

Described in 1892 as "made up of onomatopoeias, sometimes shrill and convulsive, sometimes soft and gentle like the sound of the zephyr caressing the roses of a flowerbed".

- chant Kabyle

Described in 1892 as "made up of onomatopoeias, sometimes shrill and convulsive, sometimes soft and gentle like the sound of the zephyr caressing the roses of a flowerbed".

- élégie amoureuse

Performed by Sidi-Ben-Kadour (also named Ben-Kadour) in 1893, was this "amorous elegy from his homeland".

- prière d'Allah

Featured in an 1892 review as recited by Sidi Ben Kaddour.

- prière à Mahomet

This prayer recited by Sidi-Ben-Kadour (also named Ben-Kadour) in 1893, was described as "short and sweet".

== Performers ==
Contemporary advertisements, newspaper reports and programmes describe the following performers.

Performer	Repertoire	Years	Source(s)
Adbella	pianiste arabe	1892	
Aïcha	danse des Almées	1892 1893	
Mlle Blanche	romancière	1893	
Mima Ben Saïd	danse du BerBer	1892 1893	
Sidi Ben Kadour	danse Mauresque élégie amoureuse prière d'Allah prière à Mahomet	1892 1893	
Sidi Mustapha	danse du Pilou-Pilou	1892 1893	
Zora	danse Kabile danse Kabyle	1892 1893	

== Reception ==
A February 17, 1892 review was strongly favorable towards the Concert Cosmopolite, encouraging local residents to attend the spectacle for its “rarity and strangeness.” The reviewer described the music as “oriental” and dreamlike, comparing the performance to a “veritable seraglio” transported from the One Thousand and One Nights onto the local Place d'Armes. The performers were presented through similarly exoticizing imagery: Sidi-Ben-Kadour was presented as the “sultan,” described in explicitly racialized terms, while Zora, Aïcha and Mima were presented as “sultanas,” described as graceful, alluring and youthful, and as laughing like fifteen- or sixteen-year-old girls. The reviewer characterized the entire ensemble as both “harmonious” and “oriental,” and highlighted especially the "danse du ventre", which was described as a strange novelty that had attracted crowds to the Rue du Caire at the 1889 Paris Exposition. The review illustrates the exoticizing language through which the Concert Cosmopolite and its performers were presented to contemporary audiences.

A review 24 February, 1892 expressed regret at the impending departure of Mima, Zora, Aïcha and Sidi Ben Kaddour, suggesting that their absence would disappoint music lovers and admirers of “plastique” and choreography. The reviewer praised the women as “graceful sylphs” whose “gentle undulations” and “strange poetry” had filled the audience with “orientalisme” (“Orientalism”), while describing Sidi Ben Kaddour as a “faithful servant of Mohammed”. Their performances are described as "danse du ventre" and Oriental-themed performances featuring veils, lace, pearl necklaces and tambourines. It concluded by thanking the performers for the “charming hours” they had provided and wishing them long life and prosperity.

In May 1893, the "Concert cosmopolite" performed at the Fête Saint-Spire. The production was presented as evoking the famous "Rue du Caire" attraction at the 1889 Paris Exposition, where visitors could imagine themselves transported to “l'Extrême-Orient” through its carefully preserved “local colour” and distinctive atmosphere. The performers were individually characterized as “la coquette Zora,” “l’élégante Aïcha”, “la gracieuse Mima Ben-Saïd,” Sidi Mustapha, “Mlle Blanche, romancière,” and “le magnifique noir Sidi-Ben-Kadour.” The programme included the danse des Almées, danse du Berber, danse du Sabbat and, as its “suprême attraction,” the danse du ventre, as well as songs and prayers. The review illustrates how the troupe's performers and repertoire continued to be presented through the exoticist imagery.
