= Lucien Weissenburger =

French architect

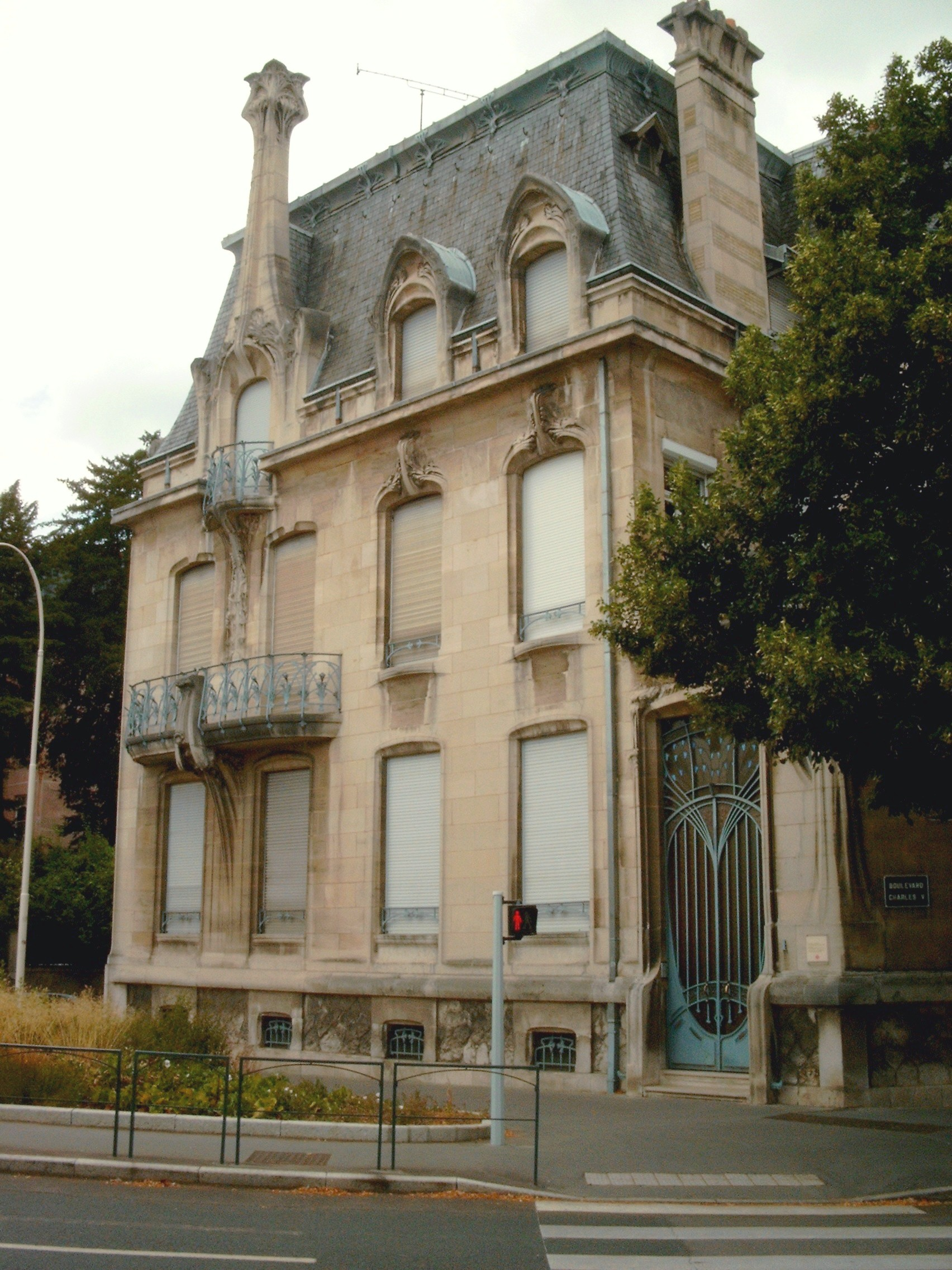
Façade of Weissenburger's own house (Immeuble Weissenburger) in Nancy.

Lucien Weissenburger (2 May 1860 – 24 February 1929) was a French architect.

Weissenburger was born and died in Nancy. He was one of the principal architects to work in the Art Nouveau style in Lorraine and was a member of the board of directors of the École de Nancy.

Some of Weissenburger's principal buildings include:

- Magasins Réunis (1890–1907; destroyed), Nancy
- Villa Jika, also known as the Villa Majorelle (1898–1902, in collaboration with Henri Sauvage), Nancy
- Imprimerie Royer (1899–1900), Nancy
- Maison Bergeret (1903-4), Nancy
- Villa Corbin (1904-9), Nancy (now the grounds of the Musée de l'École de Nancy)
- Immeuble Weissenburger (1904-6), Nancy
- Villa Henri-Emmanuel Lang (1906), Nancy
- Maison Chardot (1907), Nancy
- Theater of Lunéville (1908)
- Exposition Internationale de l'Est de la France (1909), Nancy:
  - Maison des Magasins Réunis
  - Pavillon du Gaz [Gas Pavilion]
- Brasserie Excelsior and Hotel Angleterre (1911), Nancy
- Magasins Vaxelaire, Pignot, and Cie (1913), Nancy
