= Exposition Internationale de l'Est de la France =

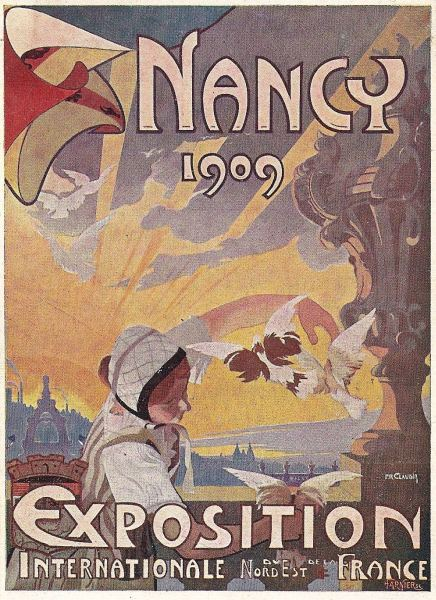
Poster for the exhibition

The Exposition Internationale de l'Est de la France or the International Exhibition of the East of France was an exhibition held in Nancy in 1909. The exhibition opened on May 1 and ran until October 31.

The exhibition was held to demonstrate recovery from the Alsace-Lorraine annexation in the 1870 war. There were over 2000 exhibitors and 2 million visitors.

Visitor attractions included a water chute, French gardens, a mining and gas pavilions. There was an Alsatian Village and a Senegalese village

The local École de Nancy had its own pavilion intended to demonstrate the close links between art and industry in the region which opened two months after the main exhibition. Many architects of the École de Nancy, including Lucien Weissenburger, Émile André, Émile Toussaint, Louis Marchal, Paul Charbonnier, Eugène Vallin, and others designed the pavilions for the exhibition.

== See also ==
- Musée de l'École de Nancy
- Human zoo
- Concert Tunisien
