= Mortagne =

Mortagne may refer to:

- Mortagne (river), a river in northeastern France
- places in France:
  - Mortagne, Vosges, in the Vosges department
  - Mortagne-au-Perche, in the Orne department
  - Mortagne-du-Nord, in the Nord department
  - Mortagne-sur-Gironde, in the Charente-Maritime department
  - Mortagne-sur-Sèvre, in the Vendée department
  - Bec-de-Mortagne, in the Seine-Maritime department
