= Musée de l'École de Nancy =

Museum in Nancy, Lorraine, France

Coordinates: 48°40′49″N 6°9′57″E

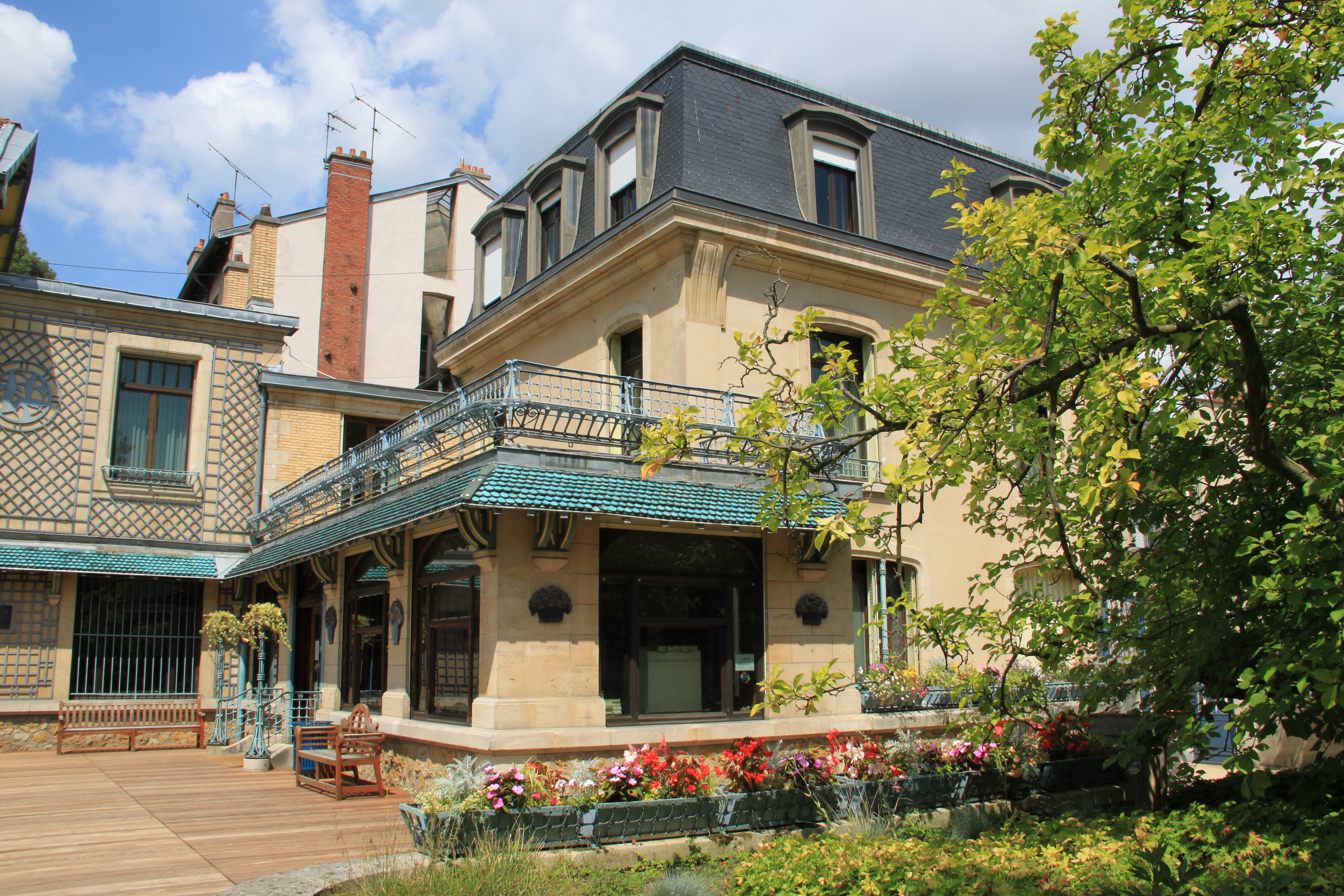
Main building of the École de Nancy, former villa of Eugène Corbin

The Musée de l'École de Nancy is a museum devoted to the École de Nancy, an Art Nouveau movement founded in 1901 by Émile Gallé, Victor Prouvé, Louis Majorelle, Antonin Daum and Eugène Vallin in the city of Nancy in Lorraine, north-eastern France. They were joined by other artists, notably the stained glass artist Jacques Grüber and the painter Michel-Auguste Colle.

The museum, opened in 1964, is set in the former house of a patron of the École de Nancy, Eugène Corbin. The architect was Lucien Weissenburger. It has a garden, an aquarium pavilion, and the main building contains works by all the major Art Nouveau artists of Nancy, which was one of the major centers of the movement in Europe.

== Gallery ==
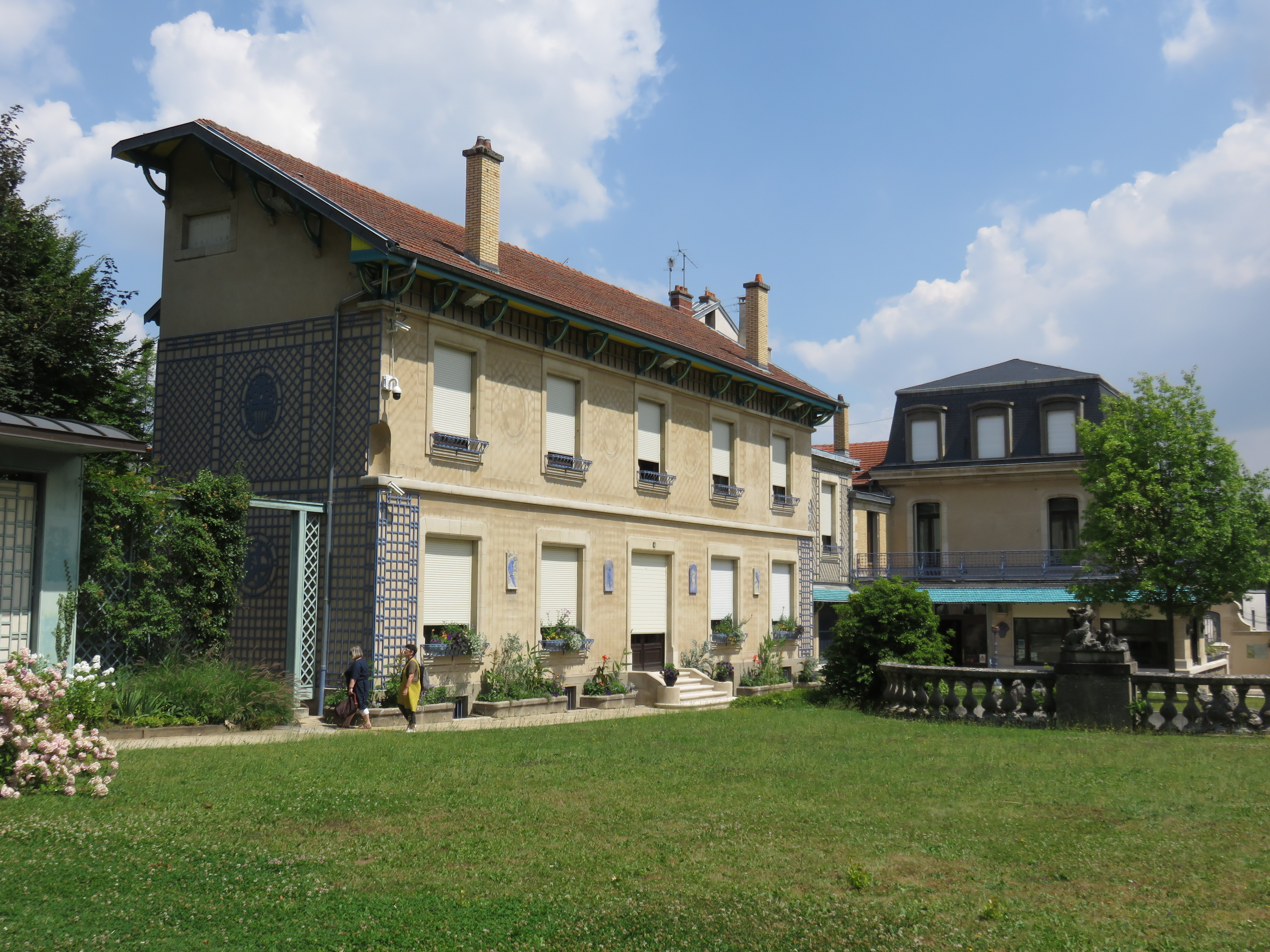

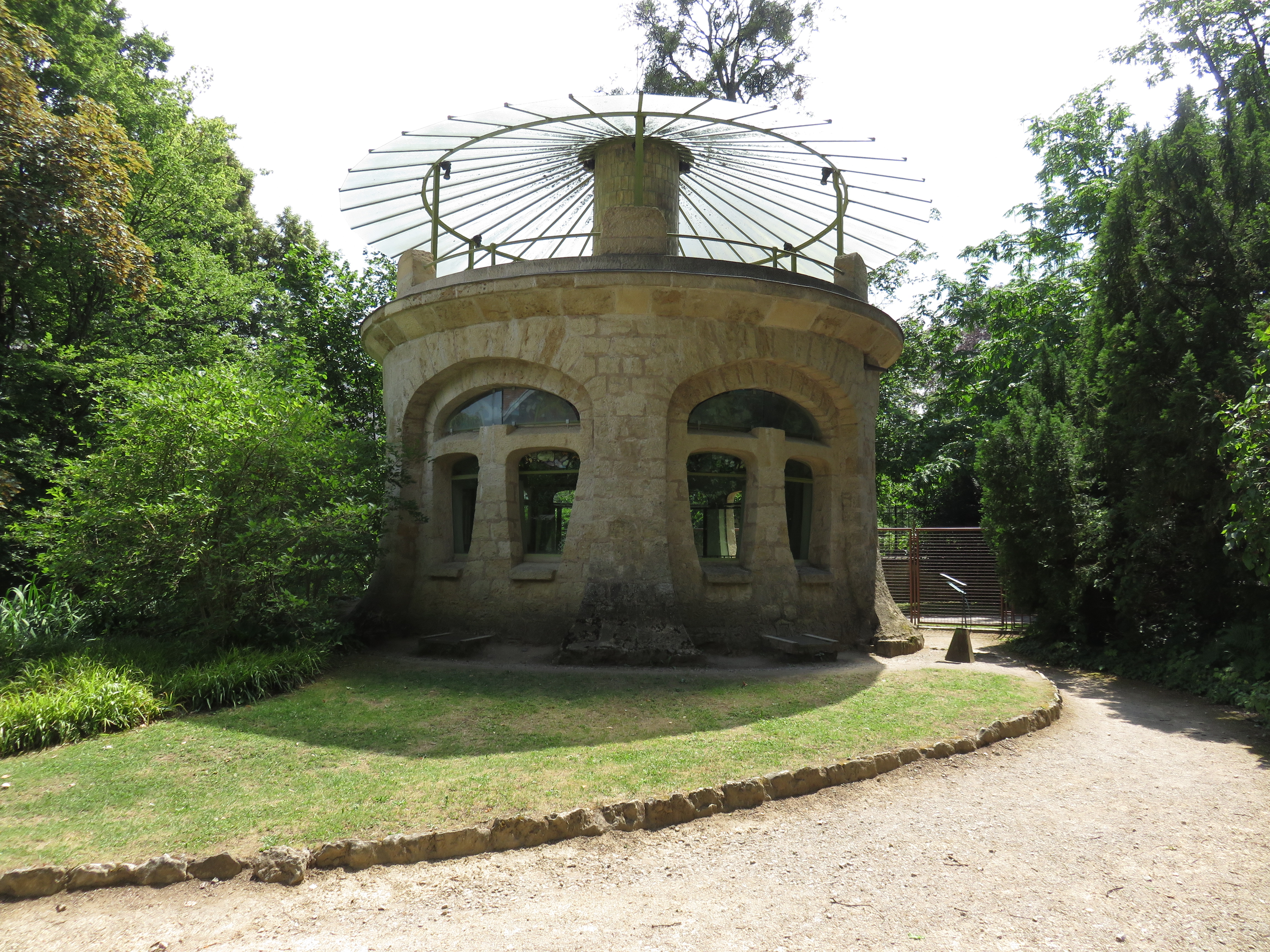

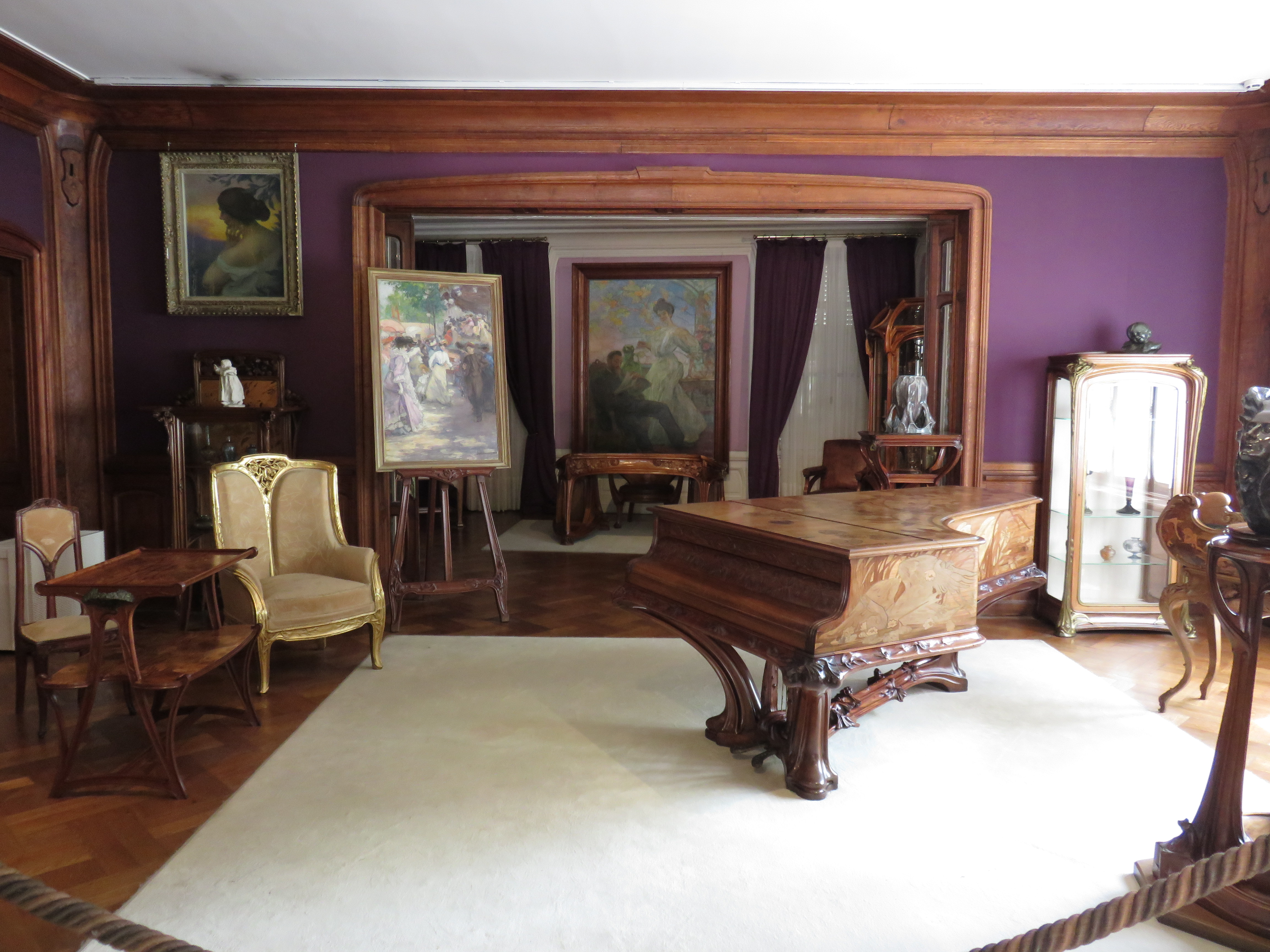

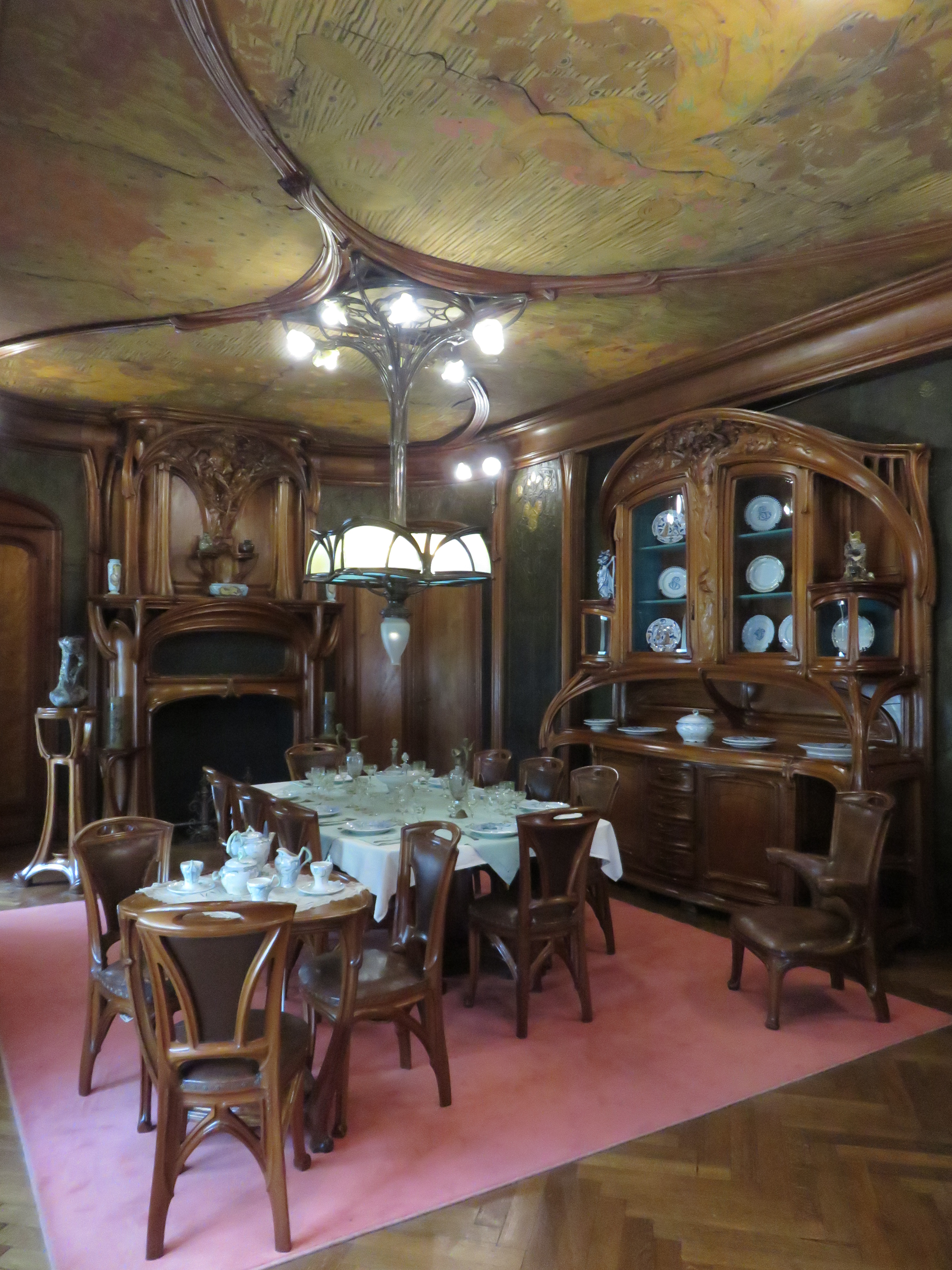

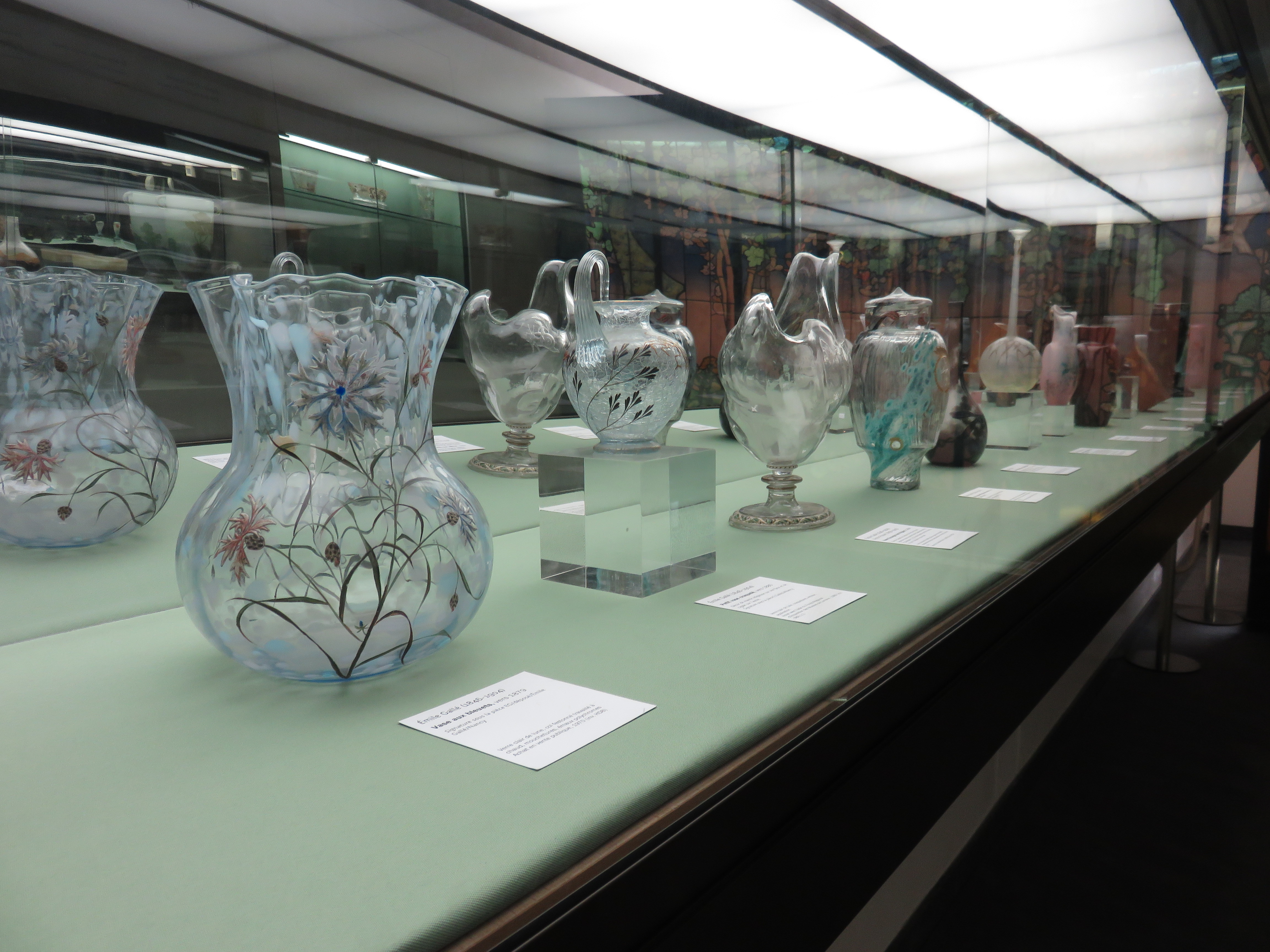

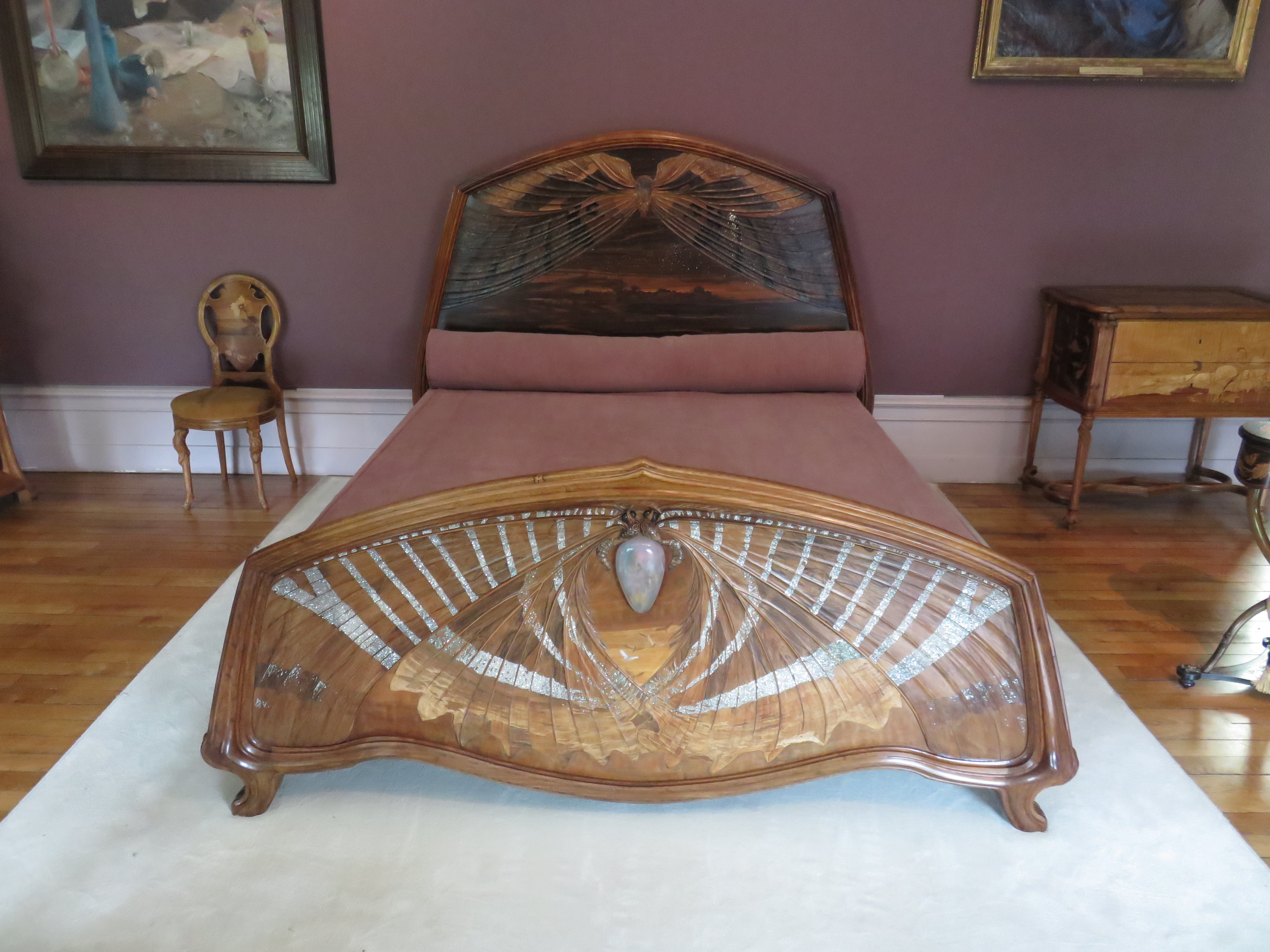

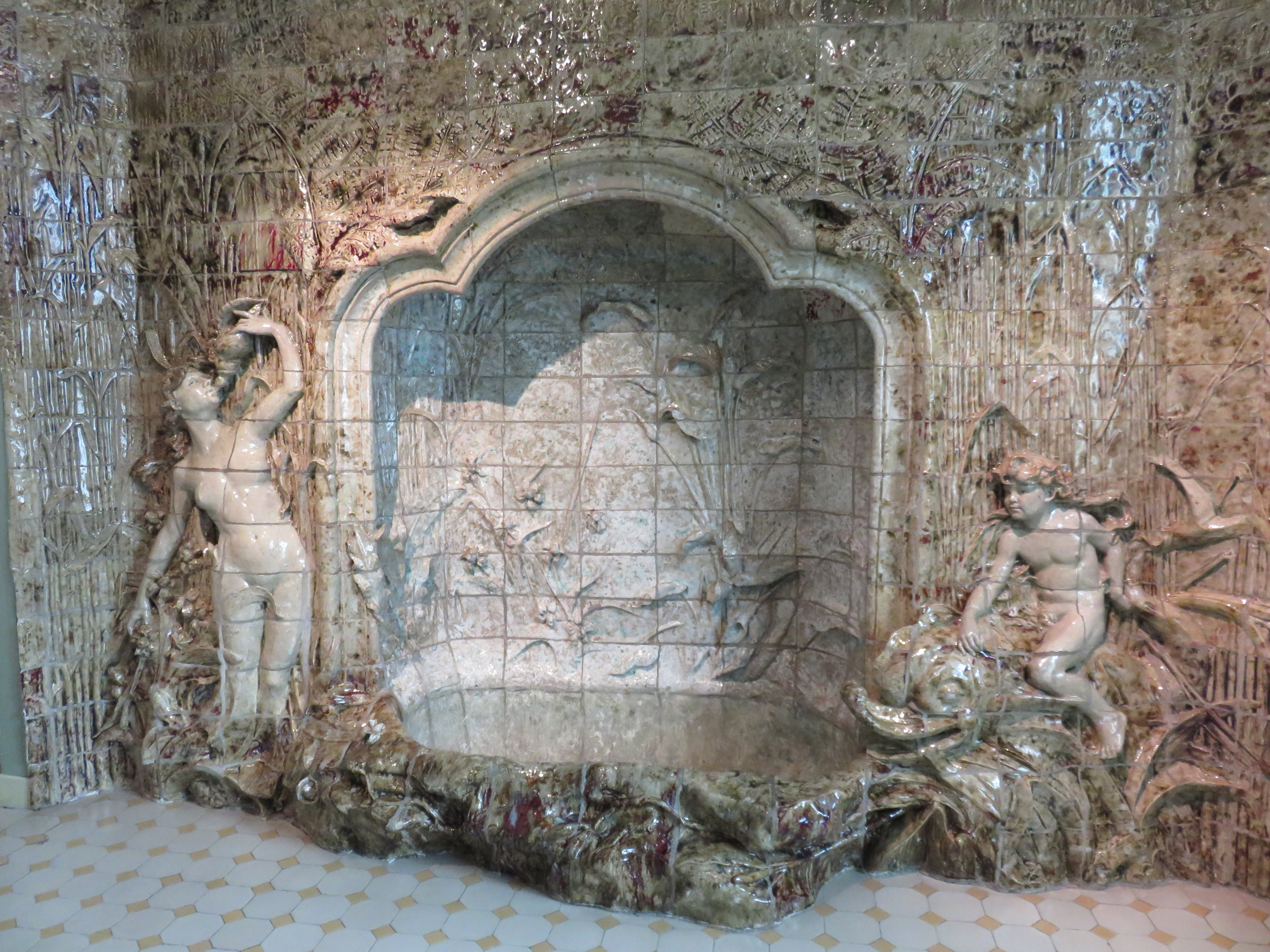

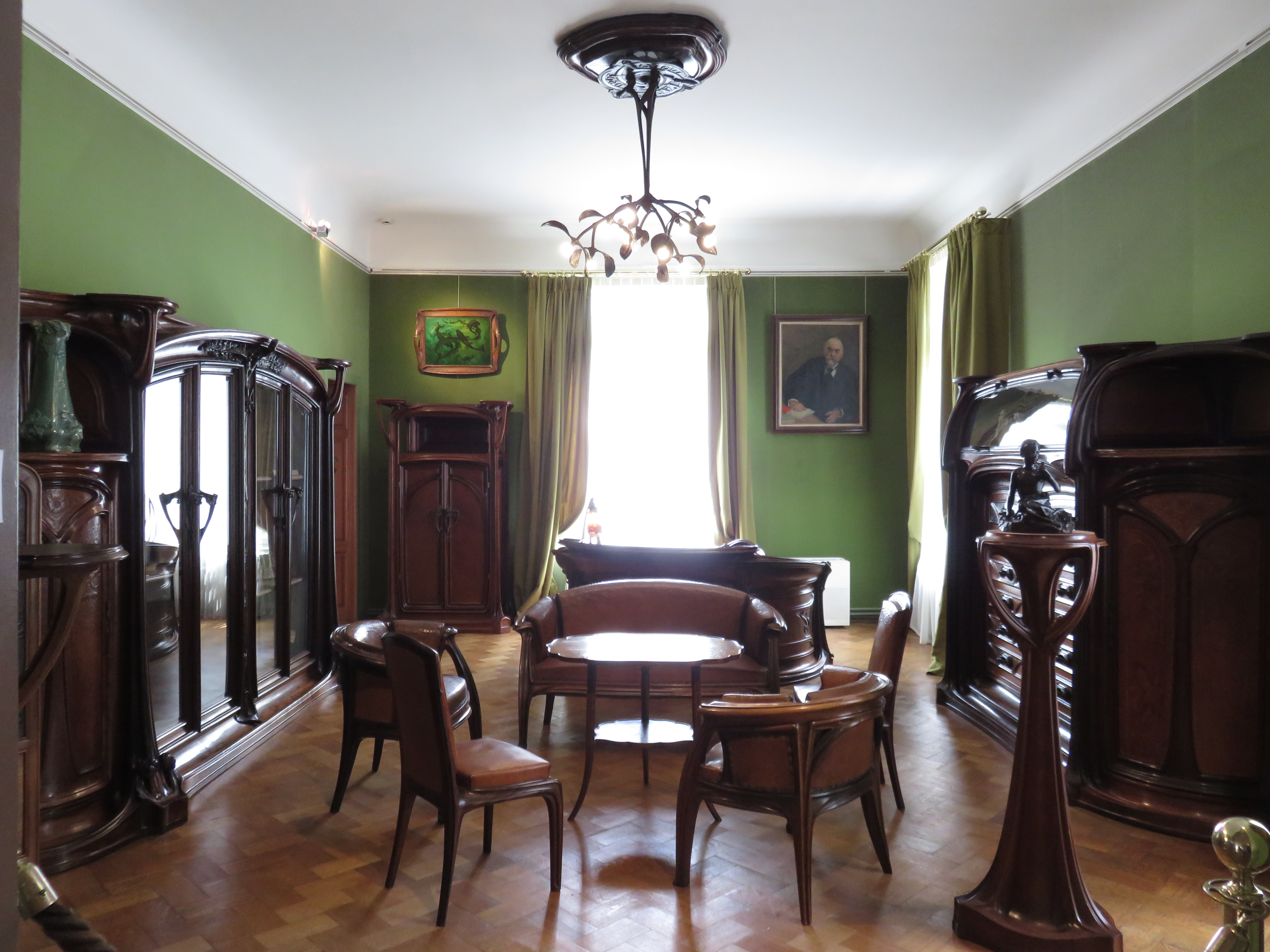

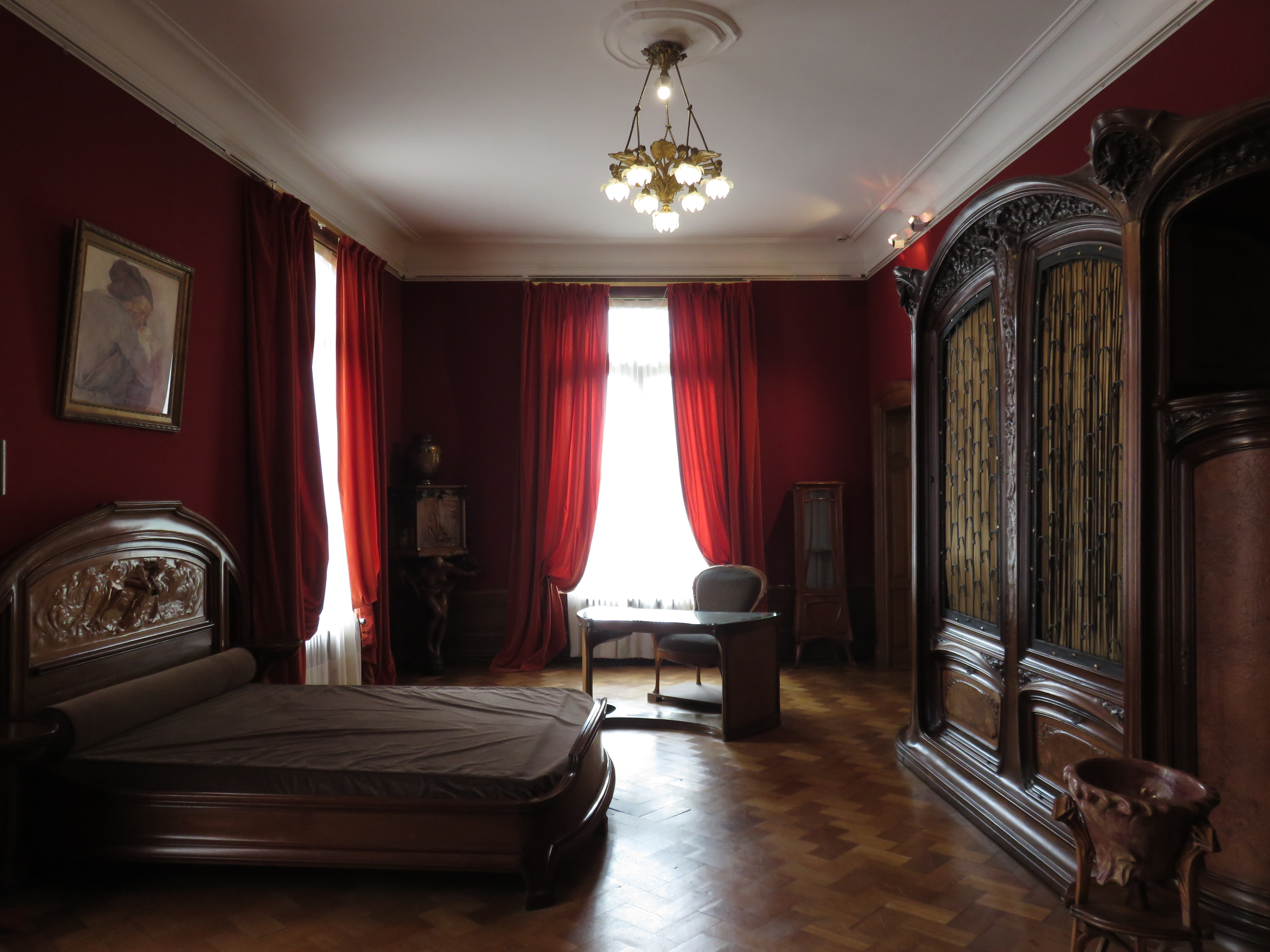
