= Charles André (disambiguation) =

Charles André (1841–1928) was a French architect.

Charles André may also refer to:

- Charles-André Doudin (born 1986), Swiss footballer
- Charles Louis François André (1842–1912), French astronomer
- Charles-André Hamelin (1947–1993), member of the Canadian House of Commons
- Charles-André Julien (1891–1991), French historian
- Charles-André Merda (1770–1812), French soldier
- Charles-André van Loo (1705–1765), French painter
