= Émile André =

French artist and architect

François-Émile André
- Born: August 22, 1871; Nancy, France
- Died: March 10, 1933 (aged 61)
- Education: École des Beaux-Arts
- Occupation: Architect
- Practice: École de Nancy

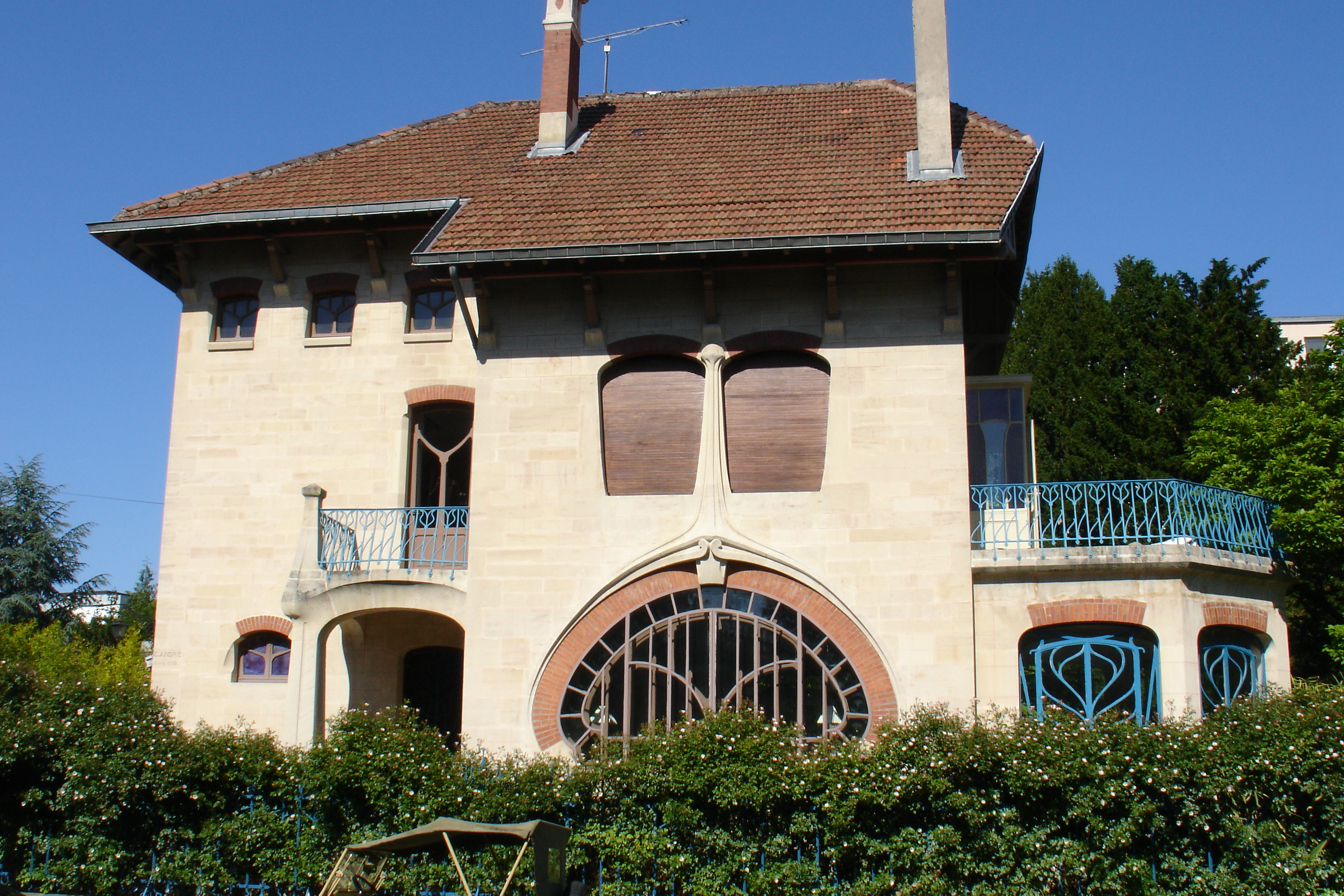
Villa Les Glycines, Nancy.

François-Émile André (August 22, 1871 – March 10, 1933) was a French architect, artist, and furniture designer. He was the son of the architect of Charles André and the father of two other architects, Jacques and Michel André.

André, a proponent of Art Nouveau architecture created Villa Les Glycines. He worked alongside Eugène Vallin and his father, Charles André.

== Life and career ==
André was born in Nancy, France. He studied architecture at the École des Beaux-Arts in Paris.

From 1894 to 1900, he traveled to Tunisia, Sicily, Egypt, Persia, and Ceylon, during which time he produced numerous notebooks that included drawings, watercolors, and photographs. He had already worked in the studio of his father, Charles André, then with Eugène Vallin, with whom he developed the principles of Art Nouveau.

He was slated to become a professor of applied arts and architecture with the École de Nancy, and is considered to be one of the group's principal architects. He built more than a dozen Art Nouveau buildings in Nancy between 1901 and 1912.
