= Eugène Vallin =

French furniture designer and architect (1856–1922)

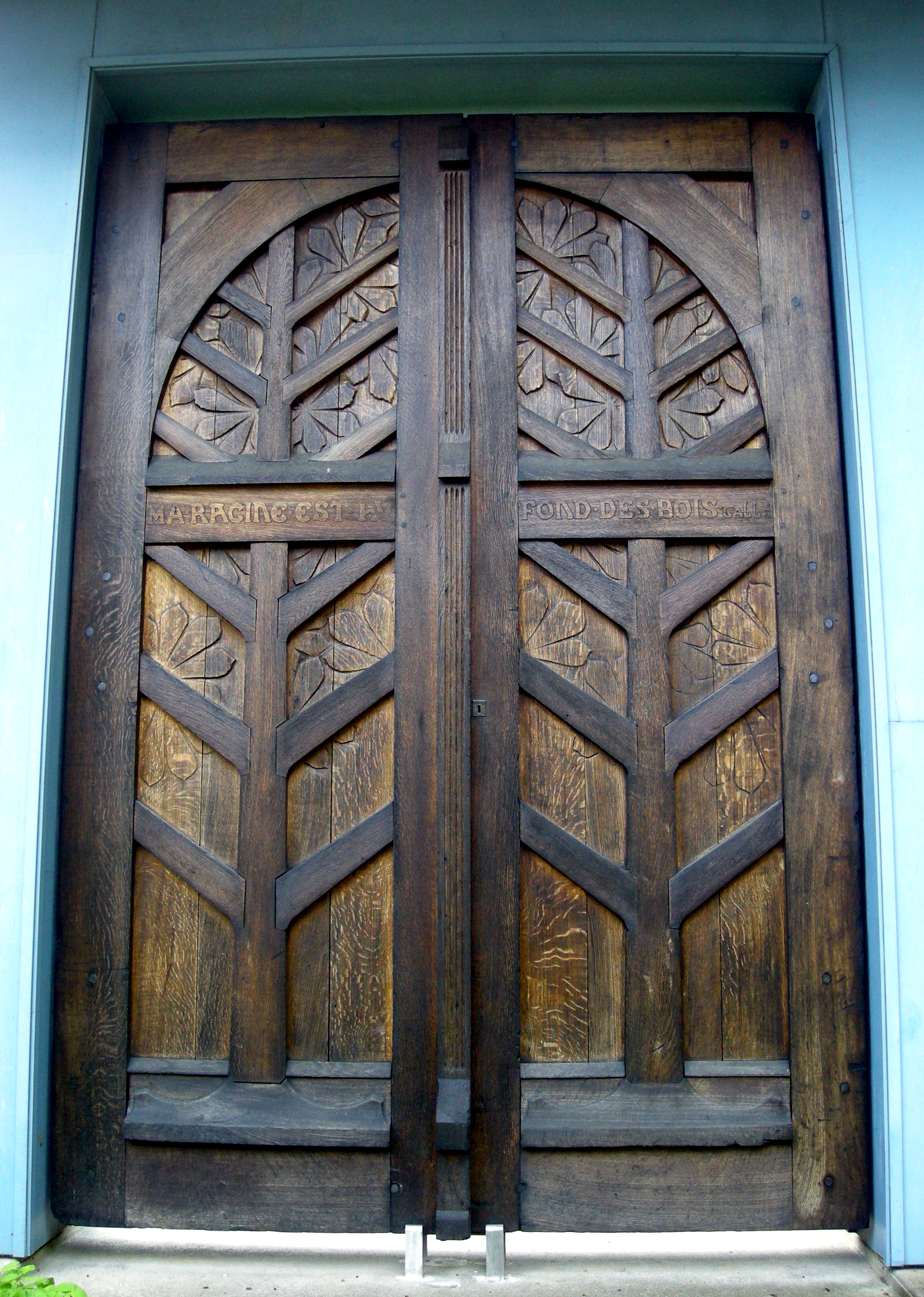
Wooden door gate made for Émile Gallé in 1897

Camille Eugène Vallin (French pronunciation: [øʒɛn valɛ̃]; 13 July 1856 – 21 July 1922) was a French architect, furniture designer, and furniture maker. He was active in the Art Nouveau movement in Nancy, France and was instrumental in the École de Nancy. Much of his early work was for churches in the Nancy area, but he also designed residential furniture ensembles for wealthy clients. Several of his buildings are classified as national monuments.

== Early life ==
Vallin was born at Herbéviller, Meurthe-et-Moselle, France, on July 13, 1856. He grew up in Nancy, France. He studied wood carving, and modeling with Charles Pètre at the Municipal School of Drawing for one year. He was apprenticed in the cabinetry shop of Charles-Auguste Claudel, his uncle who specialized in church furnishings. Through his uncle, Vallin discovered Eugène Viollet-le-Duc's Dictionnaire raisonné de l'architecture française du XIe au XVe siècle (Paris, 1854–68). Vallin took over his uncle's business in April 1881.

== Career ==
Vallin was an architect, furniture designer, and furniture maker based in Nancy. He only made furniture on commission and avoided industrialized manufacturing, something that distinguished Vallin from other furniture makers in the region. His first projects were for church interiors and furnishings in the 1890s. In 1887, he completed the neo-Gothic organ casework for the Church of St Léon in Nancy.

He exhibited examples of his Gothic-style religious furniture and woodwork at the 1894 Lorraine Decorative Art Exhibition (Exposition des Art Décoratifs) in Paris. This included a coffered ceiling that was decorated with lattice and vine leaves; Vallin later installed thid ceiling in his dining room.

Under architect Charles André, Vallin undertook the renovation of public institutions in Nancy, including creating decorations for the Nancy Court House; restoring the decorations of the Nancy Town Hall's Hall of Lost Steps, the Nancy Town Hall's marriage house, and the Salle des Pas Perdus; and reconstructing the Meurthe-et-Moselle prefecture hotel. These projects show the influence of Emile Gallé on Vallin. Vallin submitted two proposals for a military monument in Remiremont in 1894, but his designs were not accepted.

After creating a door for Gallé's new studios in 1896, Vallin quickly became a disciple of Art Nouveau. He became famous for his furniture, designing living room, dining room, and office ensembles for notable individuals of Nancy, including Albert Bergeret, Eugène Jean-Baptiste Corbin, Jules Kronberg, and Charles Masson. He also designed furniture for the Dutreux family of the Château de la Celle Saint-Cloud. Despite the stylistic influence, Vallin used less surface decoration in his furniture than Gallé.

In 1895 and 1896, Vallin worked with his friend, architect Georges Biet, to design and build his studio and house on the Boulevard Lobau in Nancy, now considered the first Art Nouveau building in the city. In return, Vallin collaborated on Biet's house at 22 rue de la Commanderie in Nancy in 1902. Vallin and Biet collaborated on numerous buildings, all of which featured a modernist influence.

Vallin worked on the Place Carnot monument in 1896 and the Captain Krug Mausoleum in 1897. In 1901, along with Antonin Daum and Louis Majorelle, Vallin became one of three vice-presidents of the steering committed of the Alliance Provinciale des Industries D'art, which became the École de Nancy. He collaborated with Victor Prouvé to design the pavilion for the École de Nancy at the International Exposition of the East of France in 1909. Vallin was a pioneer of working with reinforced concrete for building design, a technique he used for the construction of the École de Nancy pavilion.

Some of Vallin's furniture is in the collection of the Musée de l'École de Nancy and the Musée d'Orsay in Paris.

== Personal life ==
Vallin died in Nancy on 21 July 1922. His son, Auguste Vallin (1881–1967) was a sculptor.

== Selected works ==
=== Church furnishings ===
Although not widely known for this activity, Vallin nevertheless designed some organ caseworks for churches in Lorraine:

- in Meurthe-et-Moselle:
  - Ancerviller – benches and pulpit
  - Church of Notre-Dame-de-Bonsecours in Nancy – Louis XV-style confessional
  - Church of Saint-Jacques in Lunéville –choir organ
  - Church of Saint Joseph in Nancy – pulpit and furniture
  - Church of Saint-Léon-IX in Nancy – neo-Gothic organ casework
  - Church of Saint-Nicolas in Nancy
  - Einville-au-Jard – benches, pulpit (removed) and choir woodwork
- in Meuse:
  - Euville and Saint-Mihiel – choir organ in the Saint-Mihiel Abbey
  - Church of Saint-Georges in Buxières-sous-les-Côtes – oak organ casework created in 1898, listed on the Supplementary Inventory of Historic Monuments in 1992
- in Vosges
  - Thaon-les-Vosges (originating from the Abbey of Notre-Dame d'Autrey)
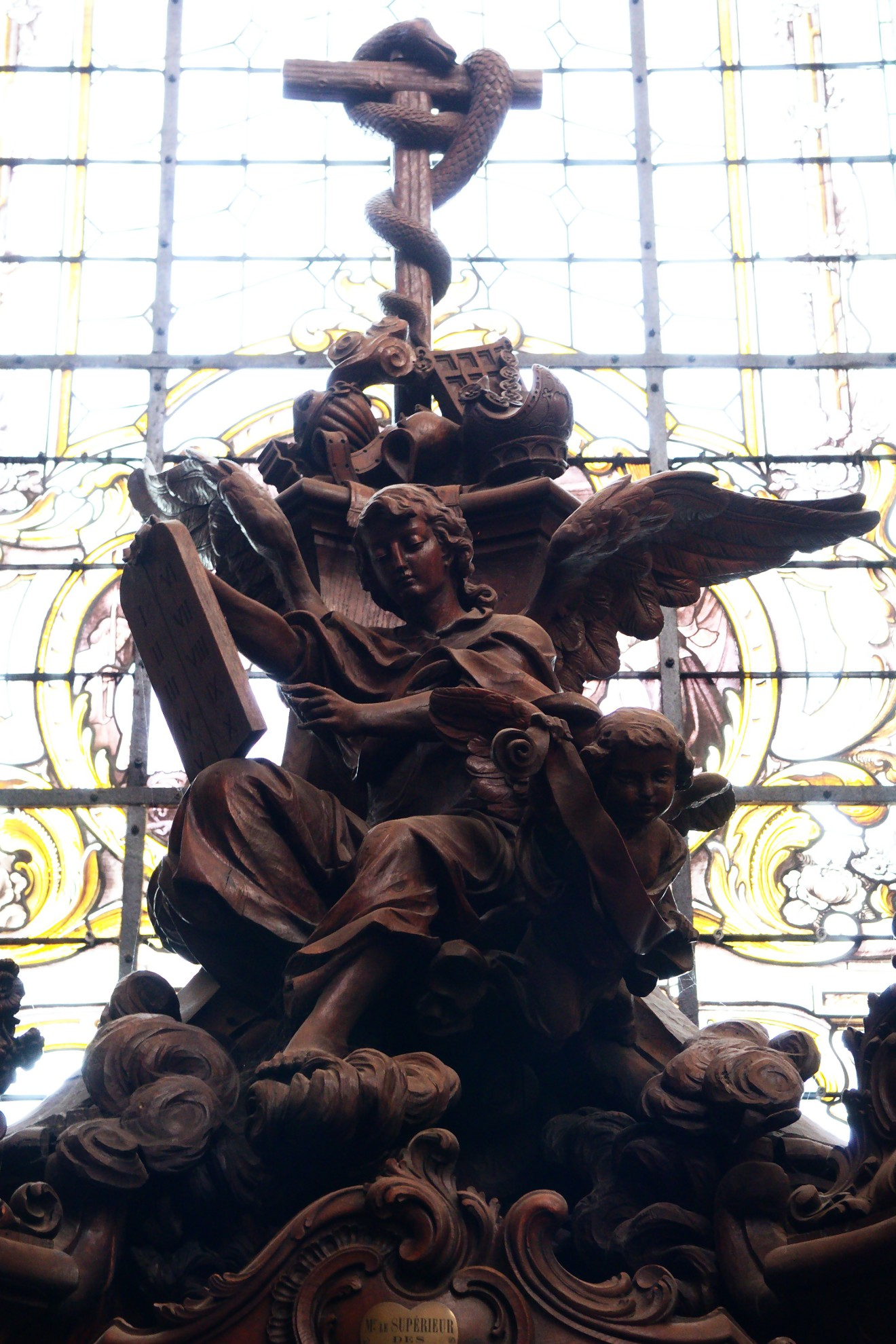
Confessional in Notre-Dame-de-Bonsecours.

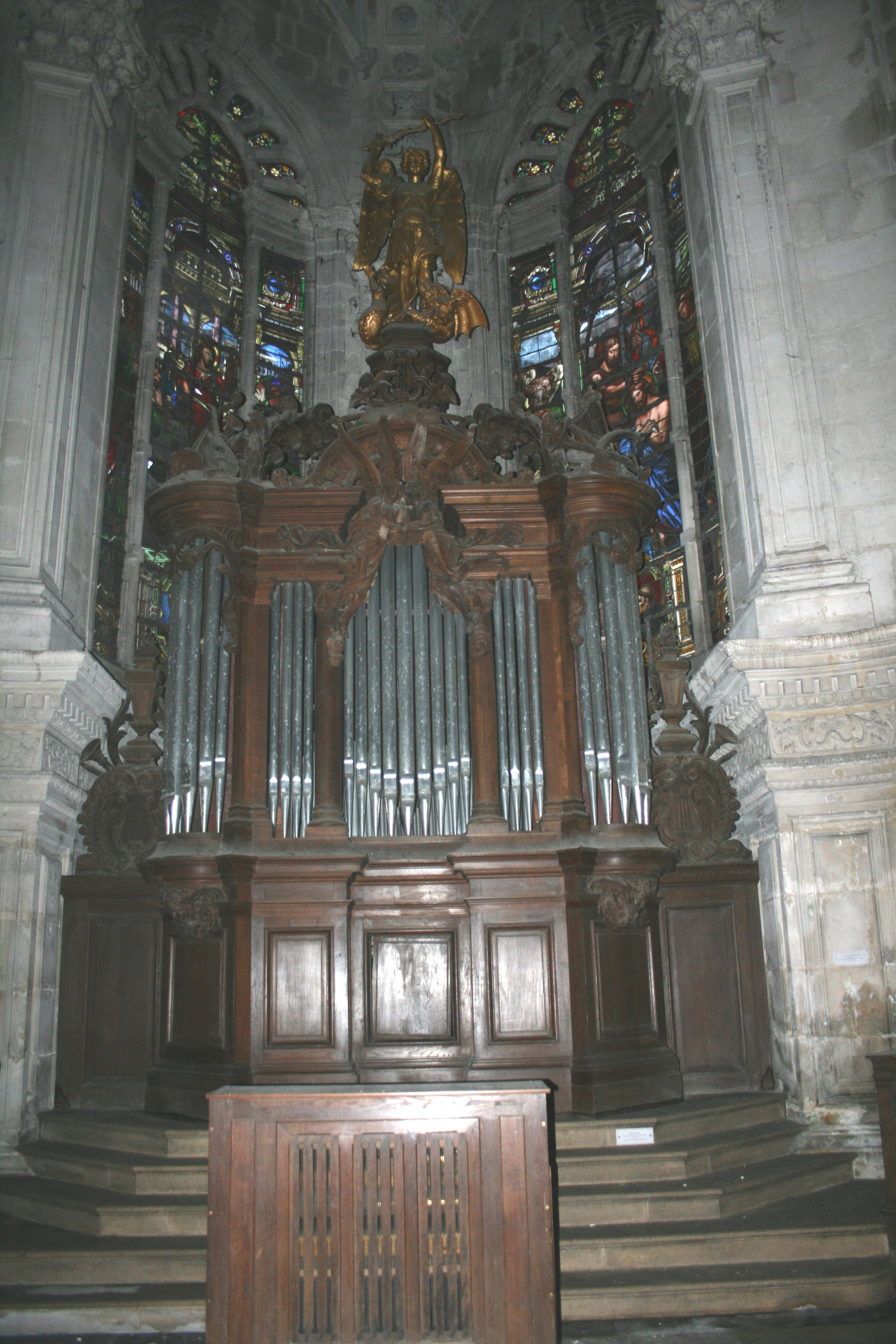
Saint-Michel Abbey.

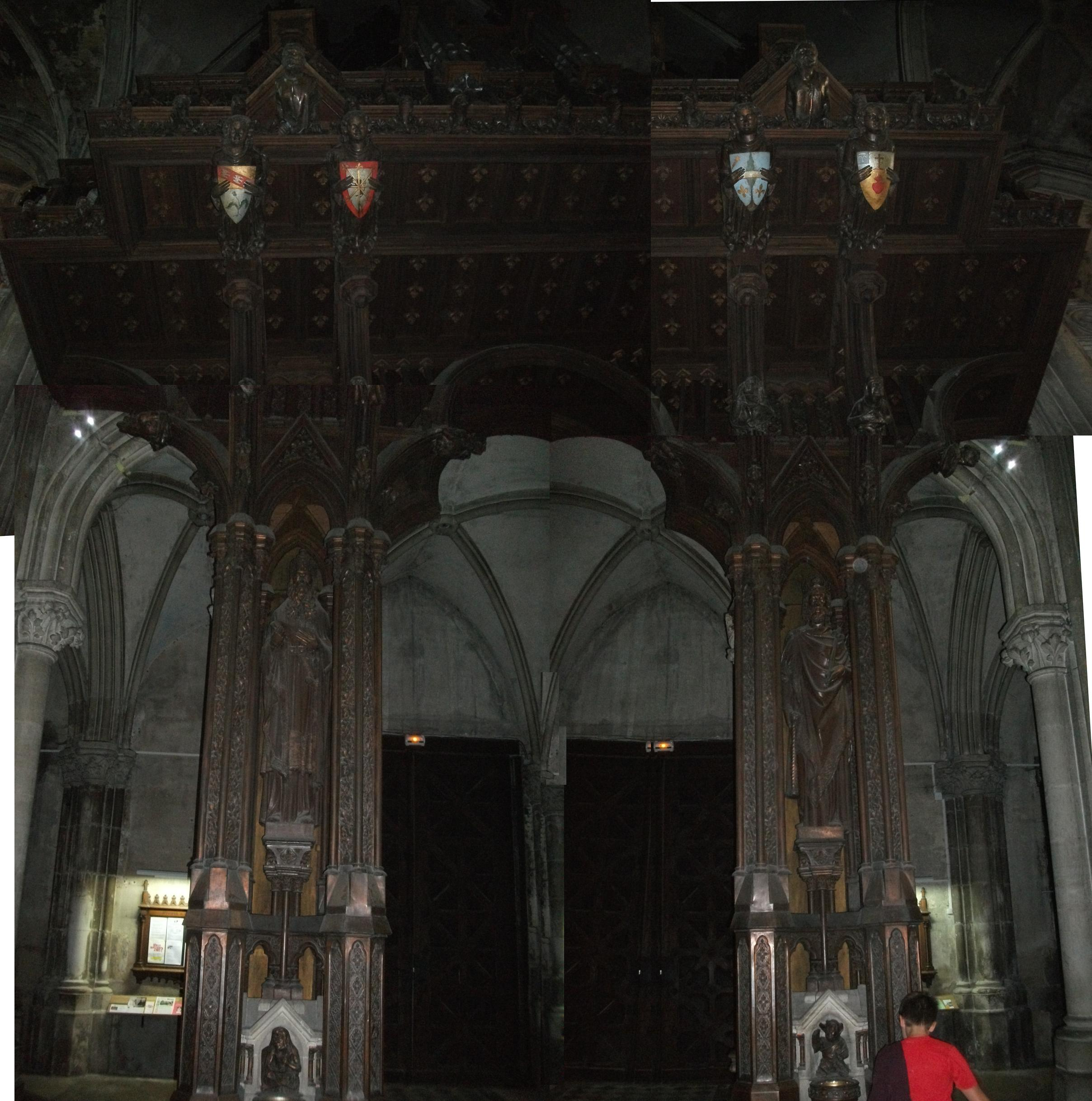
Armorial and ornate support for the organ in the Church of Saint-Léon-IX.

=== Architectural works ===
- Vallin House and Workshop (1896) at 6-8 Boulevard Lobau in Nancy. Classified as a historical monument.
- Maison du peuple (1902) at 2 Rue Drouin in Nancy
- Georges Biet Villa (1902 in collaboration with Georges Biet) at 22 Rue de la Commanderie in Nancy
- Hôtel de ville d'Euville (11903 in collaboration with Henry Gutton and Joseph Hornecker)
- Henri Aimé Building (1905 in collaboration with Georges Biet) at 42–44, rue Saint Dizier in Nancy. The street façade, lobby, and part of the roof were listed as historical monuments on 4 May 1994.
- Immeuble Margo (1906, in collaboration with Paul Charbonnier), an apartment building at 86 Rue Stanislas in Nancy. Classified as a historical monument.
- Euville Town Hall and School (1906 in collaboration with Henri Gutton) at Rue Jeanne d'Arc in Euville
- Pharmacie Malard (1907) at 23 Place Charles-de-Gaulle in Commercy
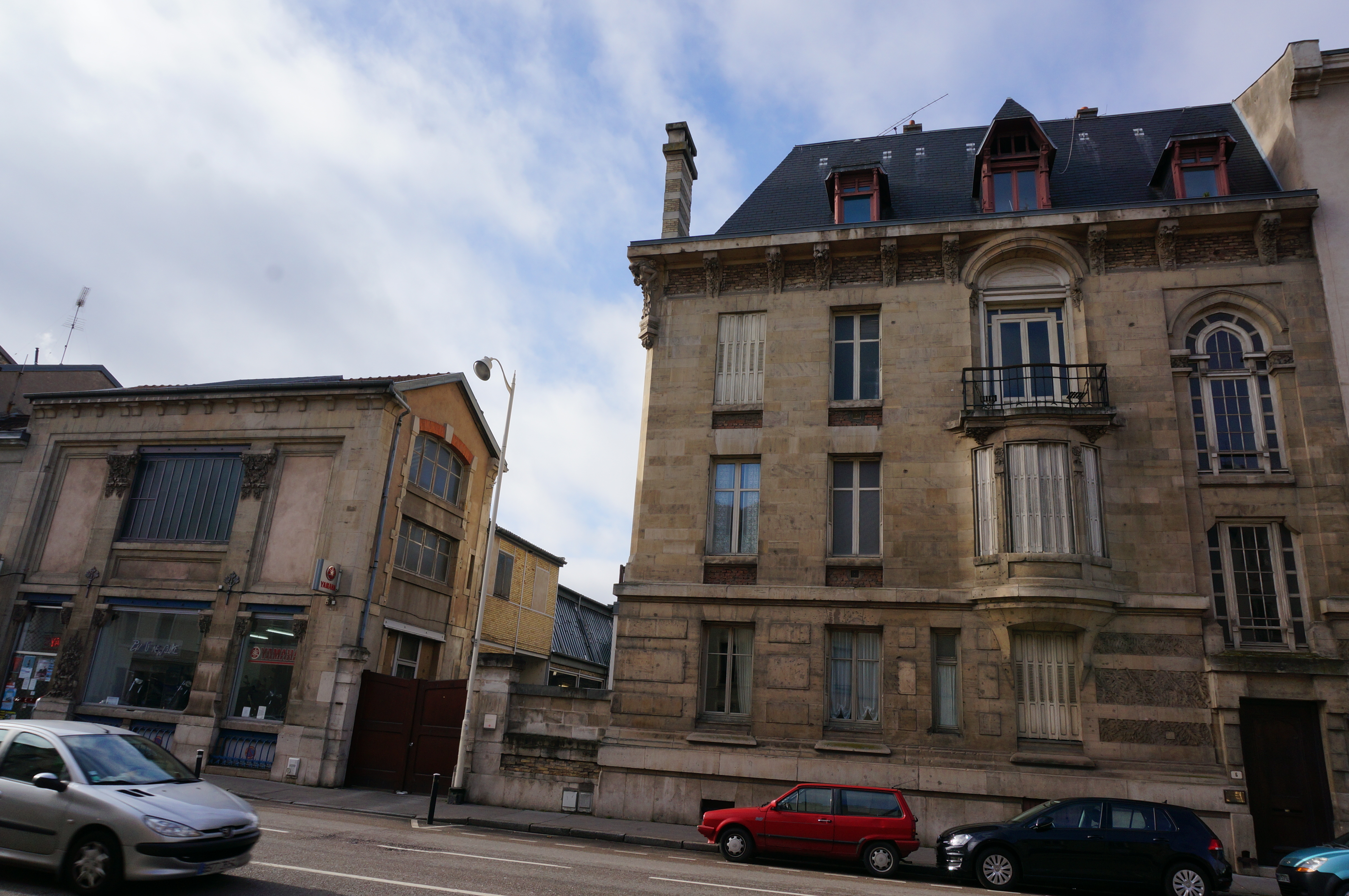
Maison et Atelier Vallin.

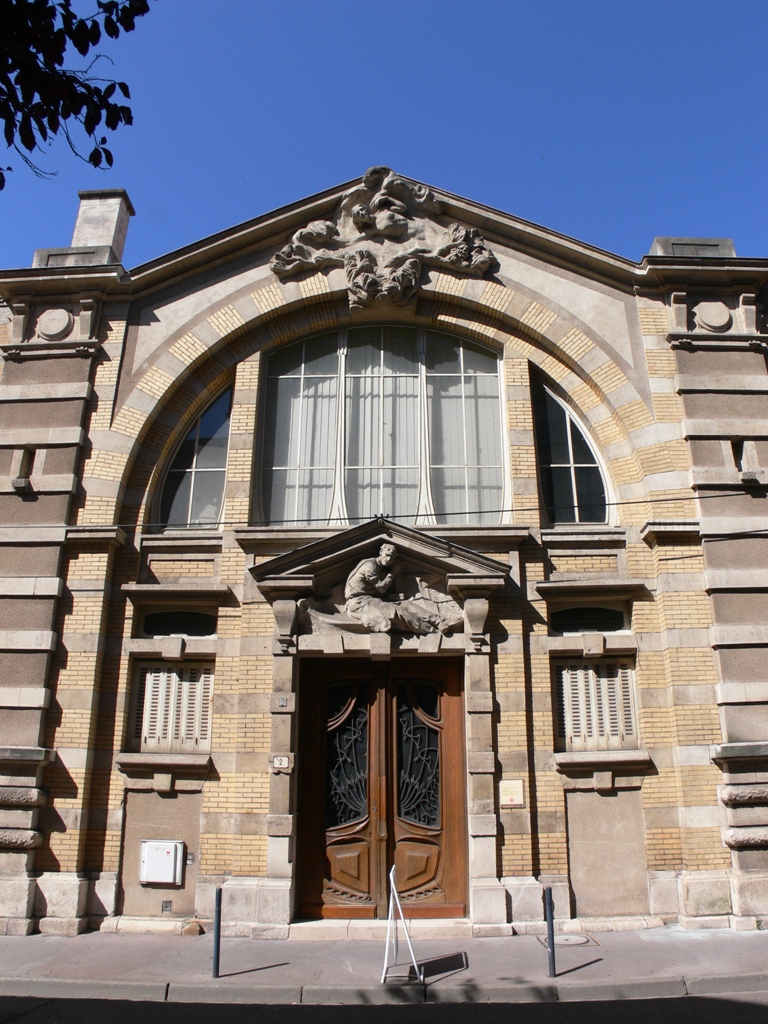
Maison du Peuple.

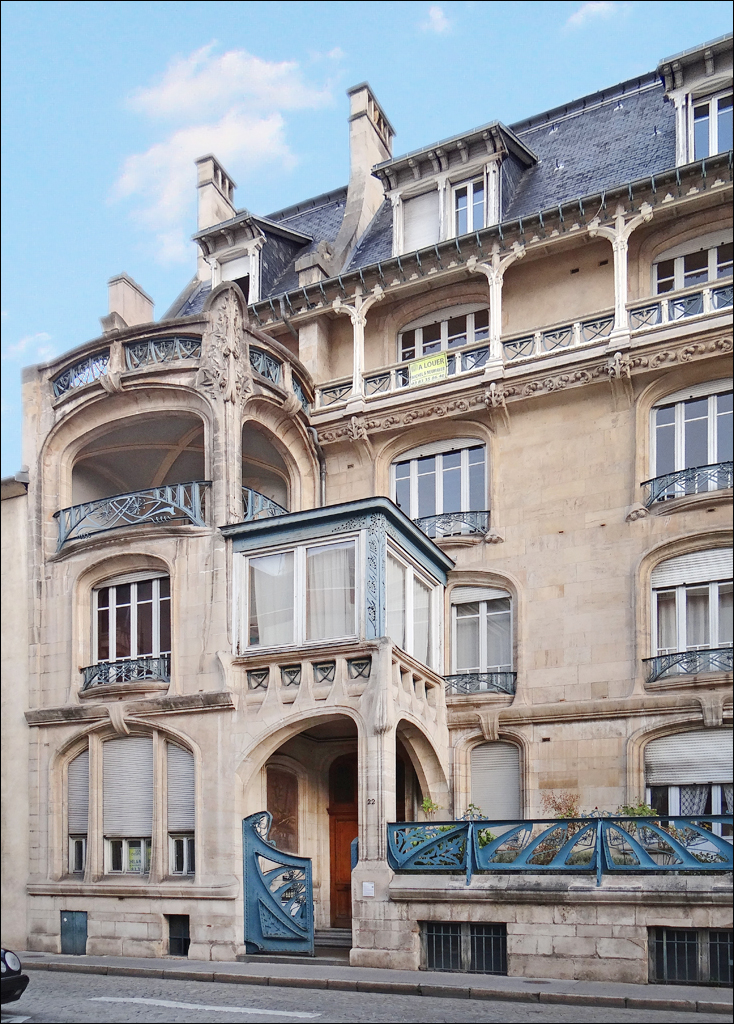
Immeuble Georges Biet.

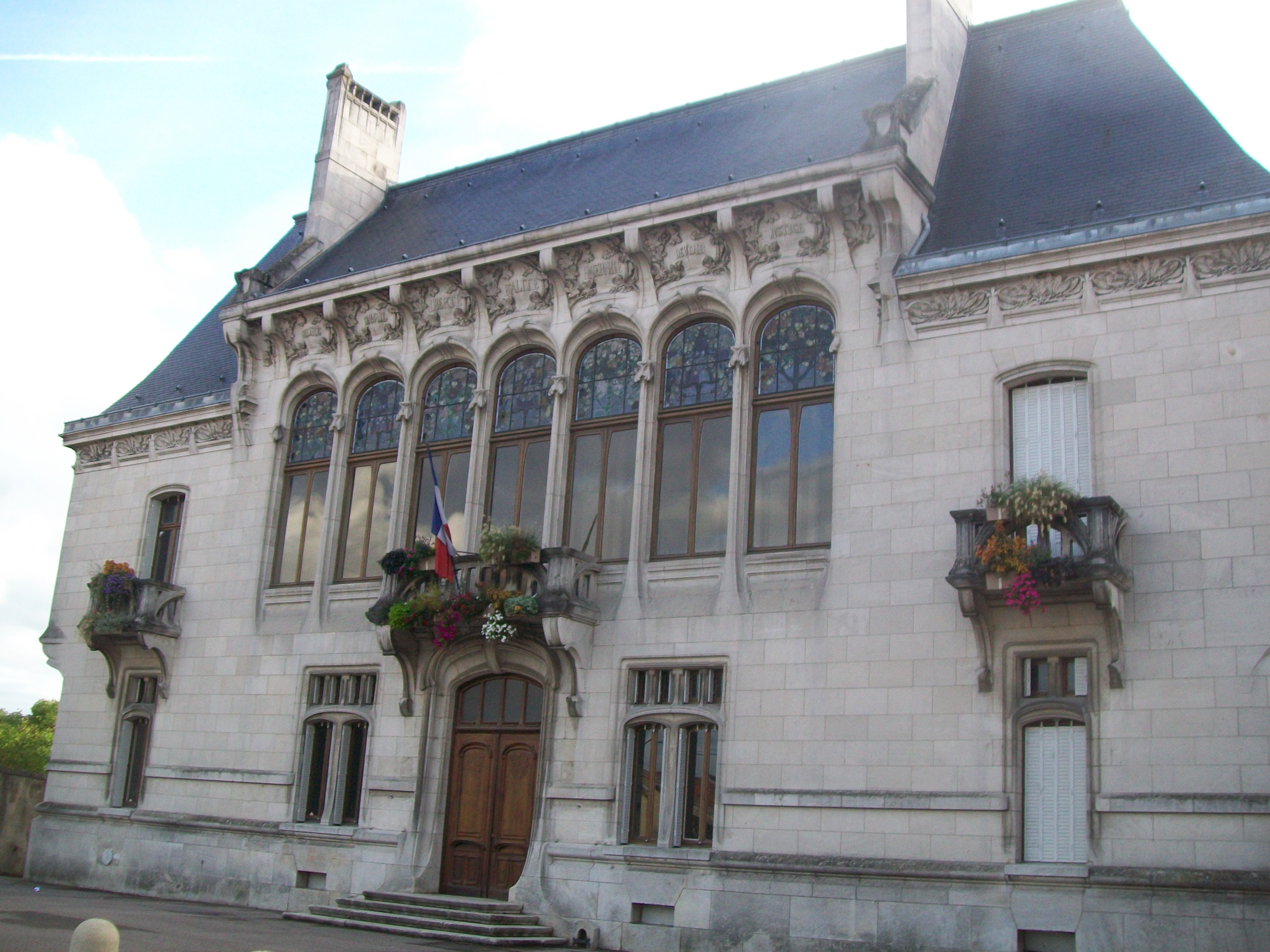
Hôtel de ville d'Euville.

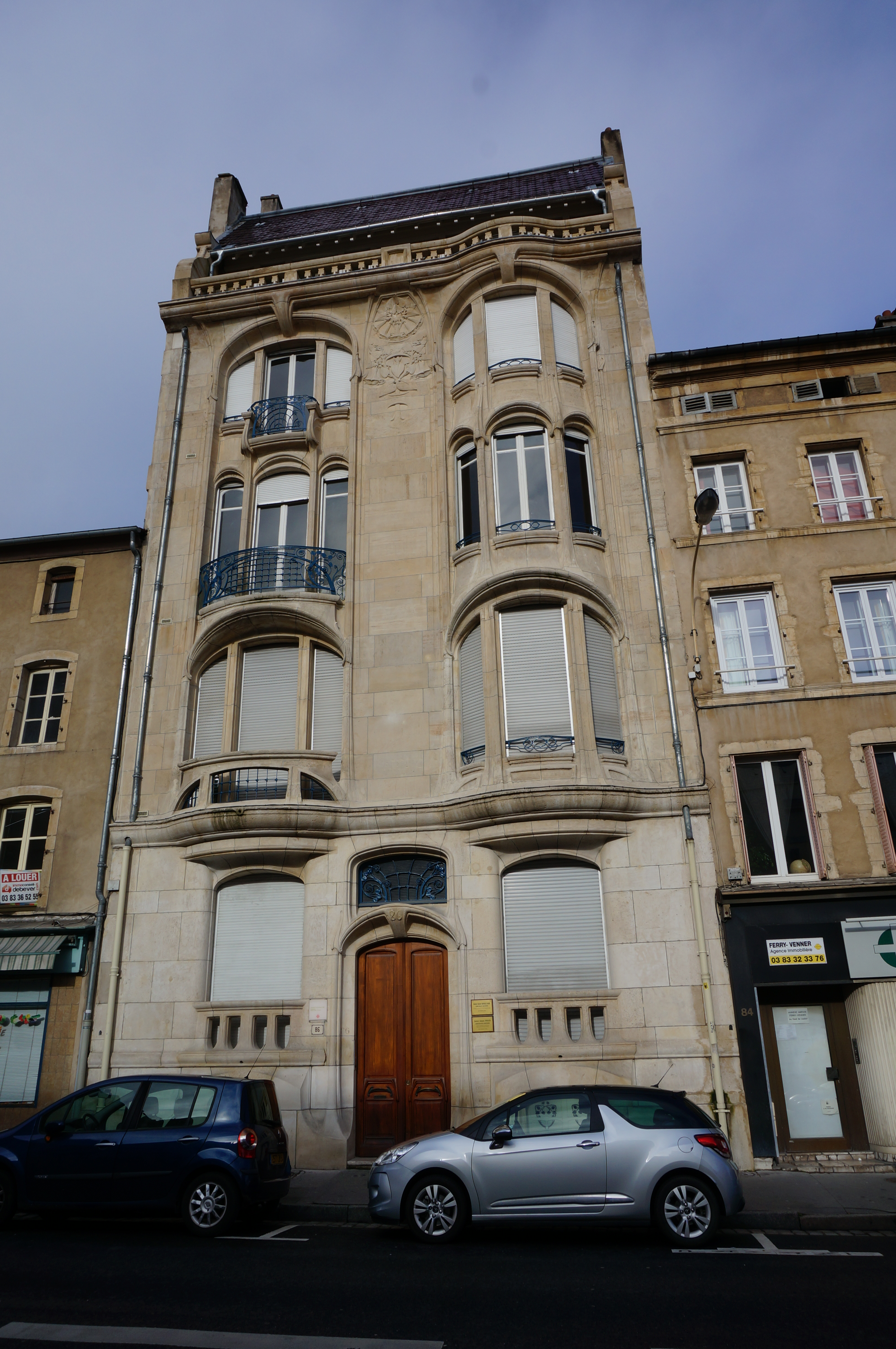
Immeuble Margo.

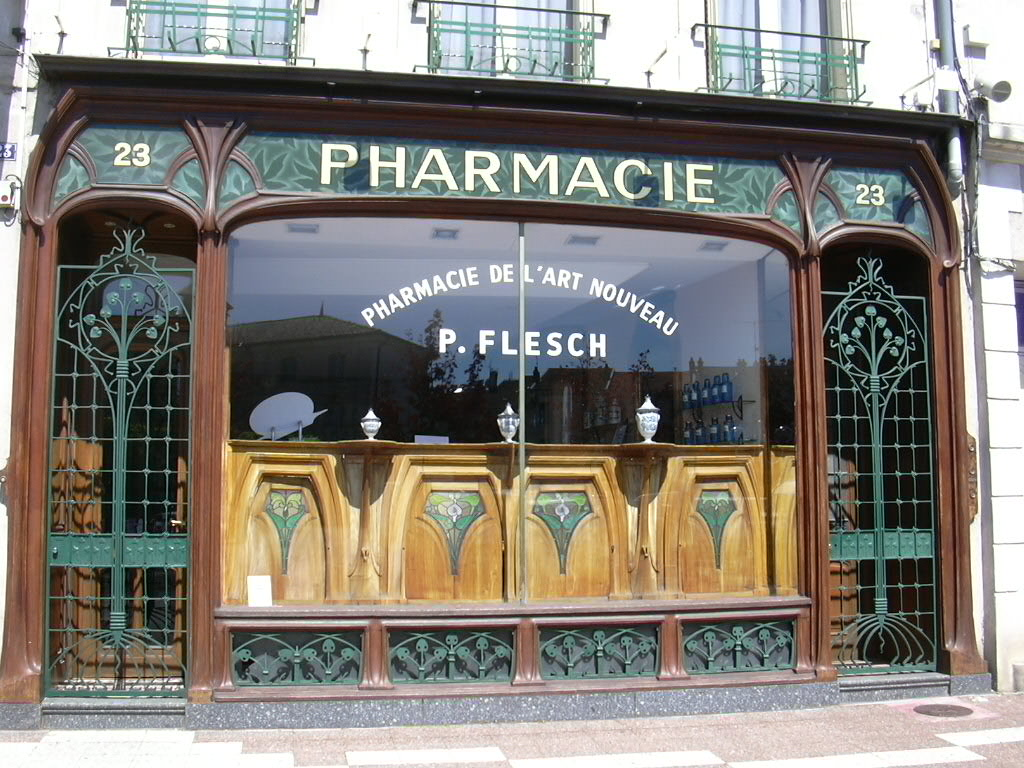
Pharmacie Malard.

=== Cabinetmaking ===
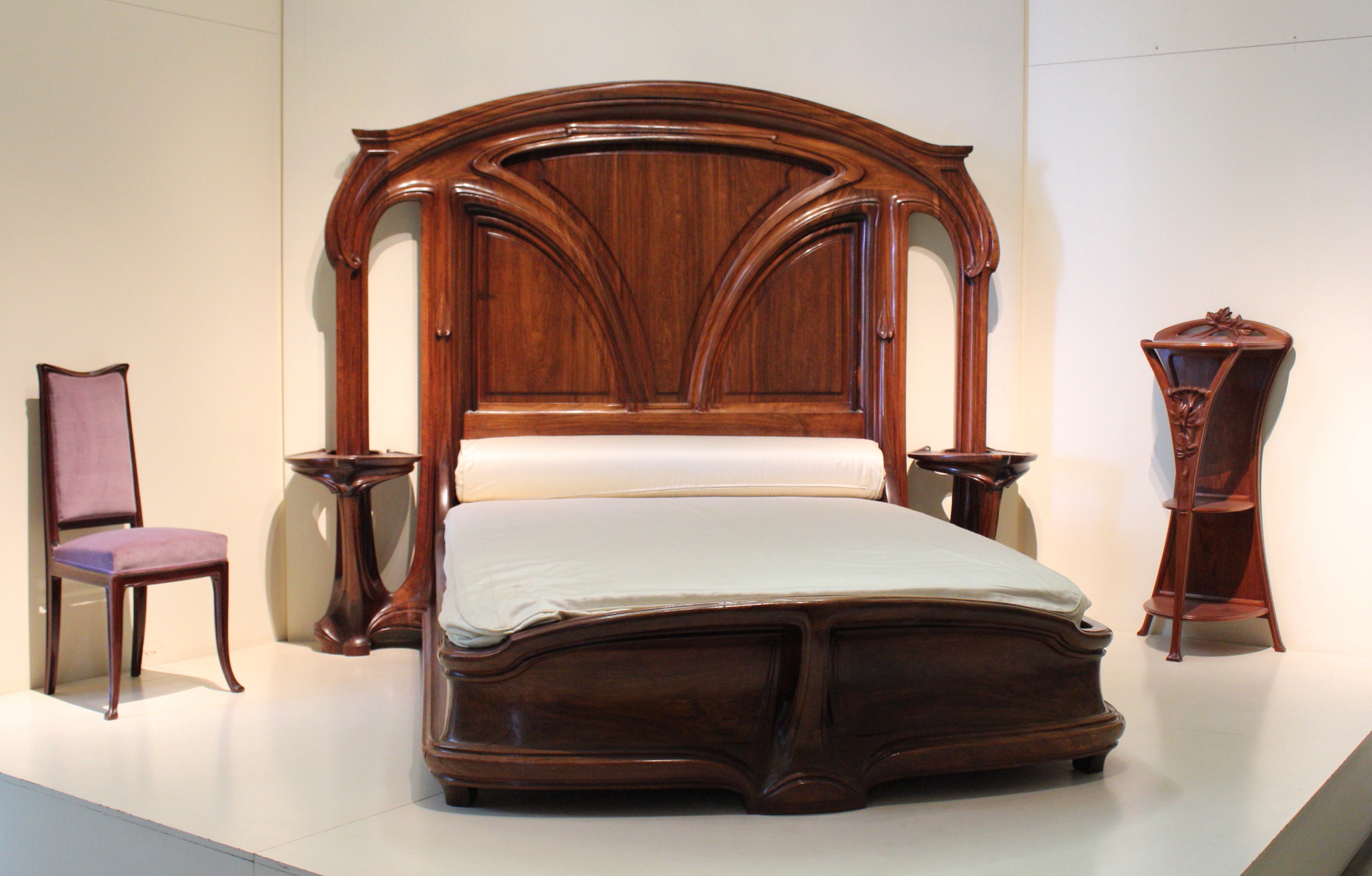
Bed and bedside table
Musée d'Orsay

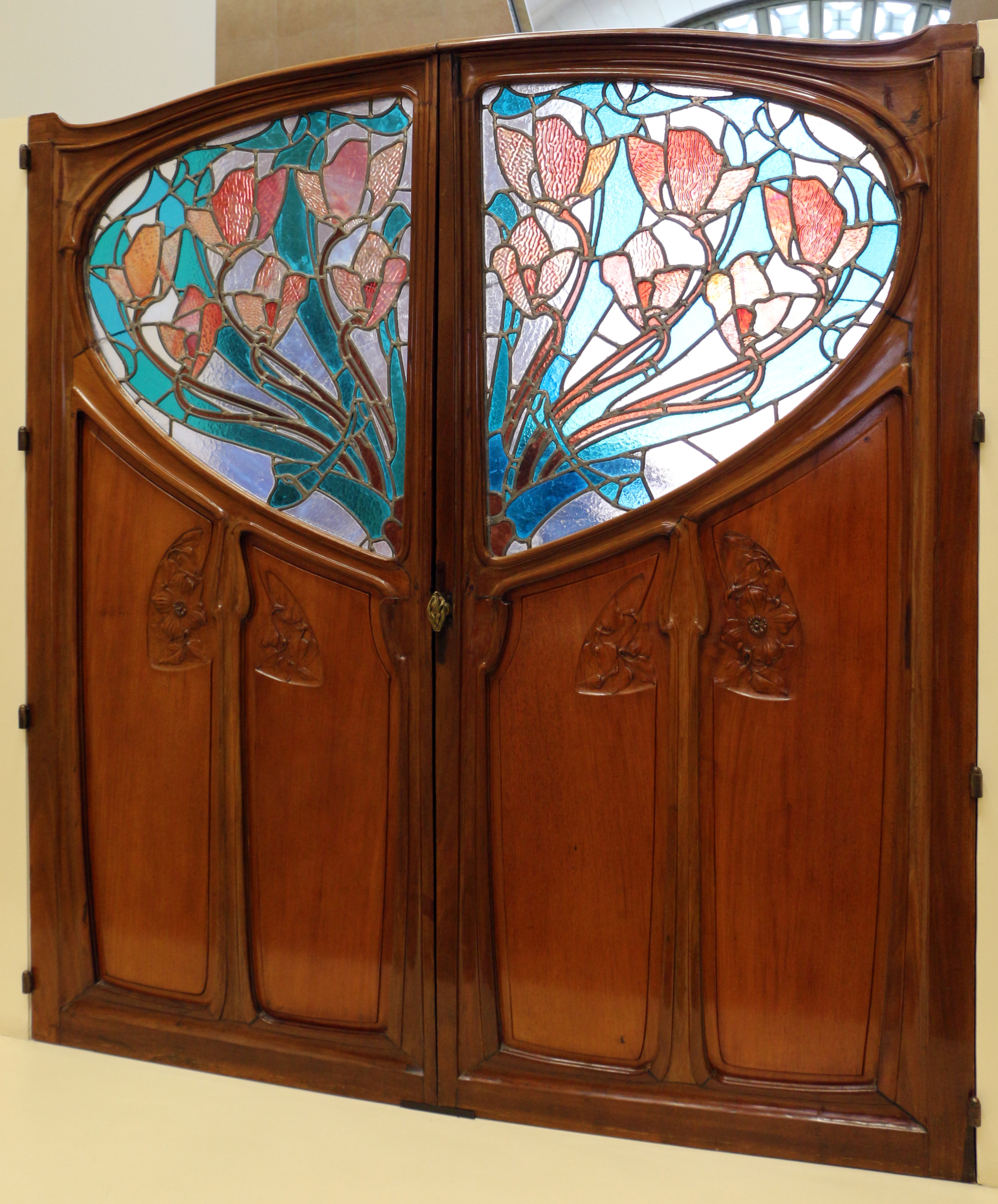
Door
created in collaboration with Émile André
Musée d'Orsay.

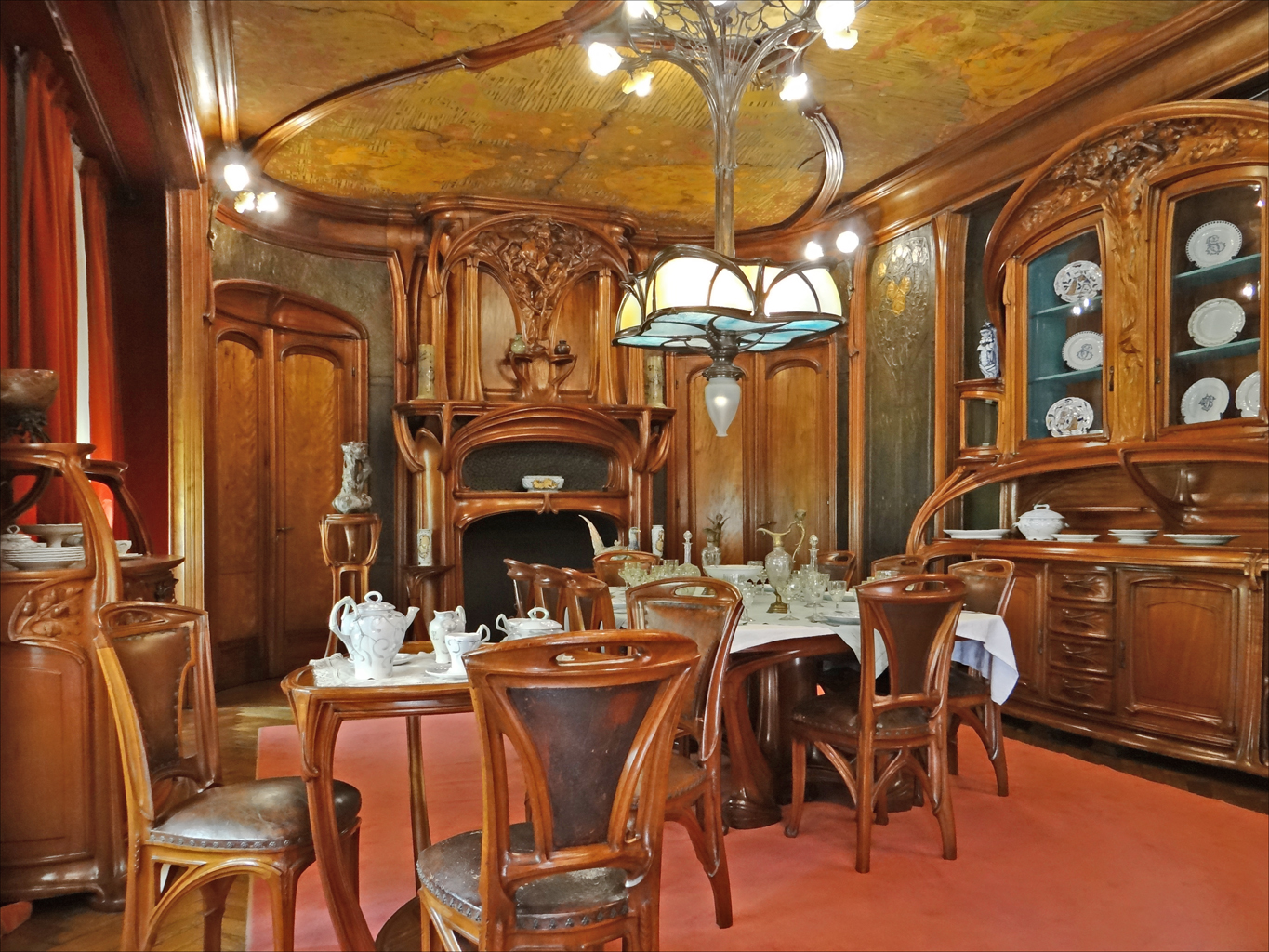
Dining room
Musée de l'École de Nancy

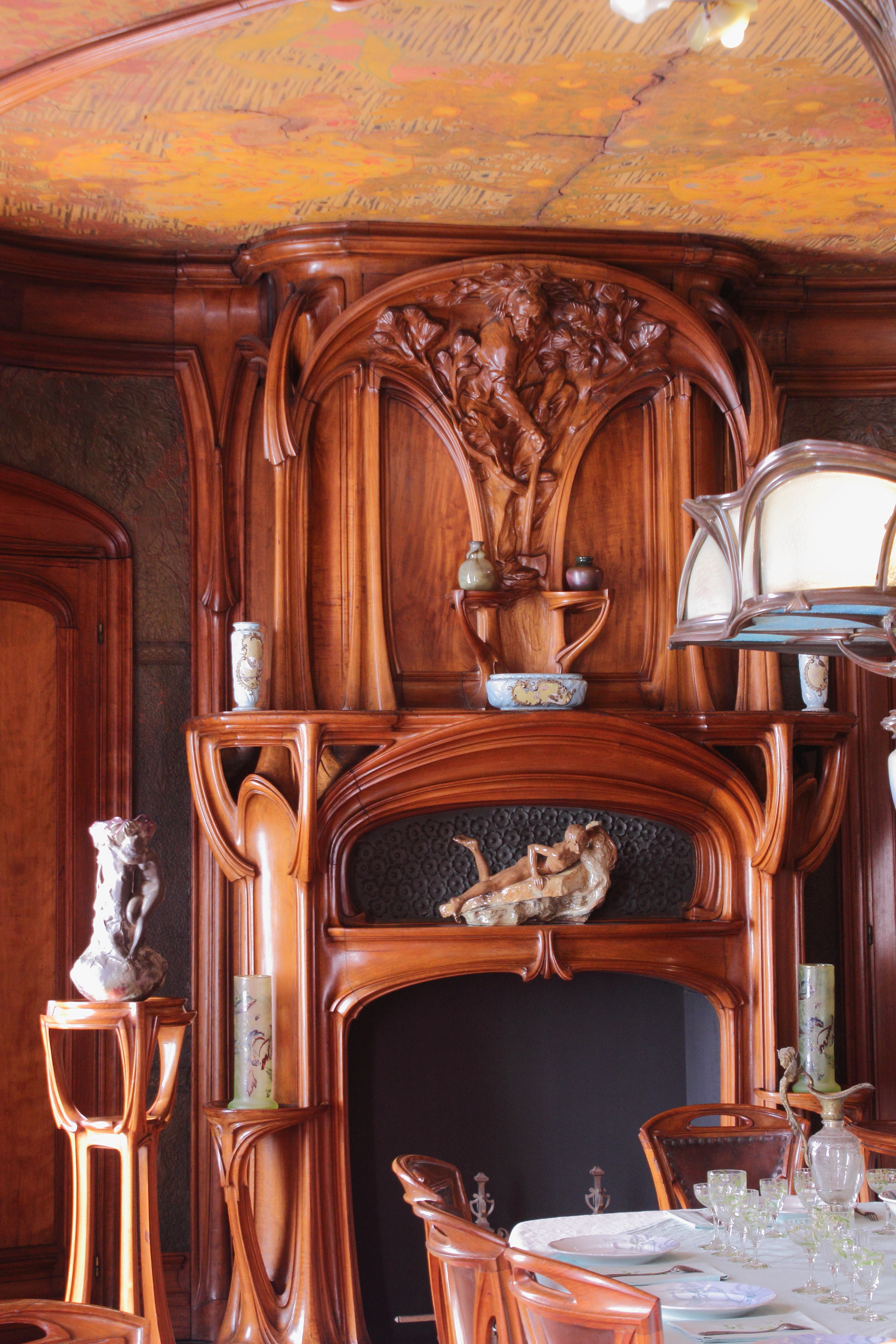
Detail of the dining room
Musée de l'École de Nancy.
