= Charles Louis François André =

French astronomer (1842–1912)

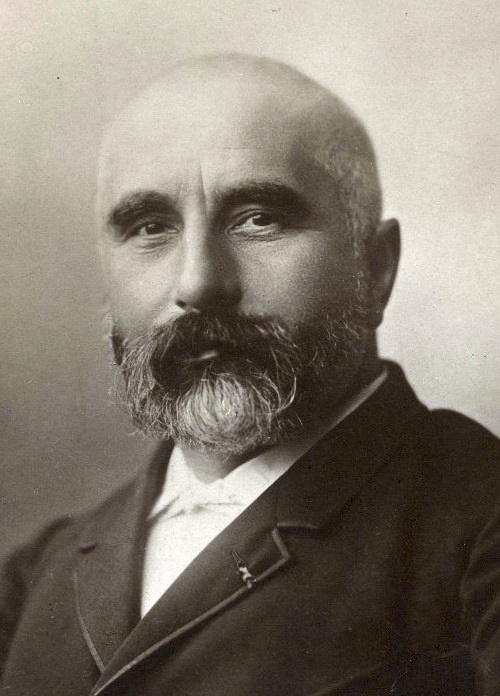

Charles Louis François André (March 14, 1842 – June 6, 1912) was a French astronomer, founder of the Lyon Observatory, which he directed from 1879 until his death.

Charles André was born in Chauny to the watchmaker Louis Alexandre François André and Placidie Godet. He studied at the private Catholic institution Saint-Charles and joined the École Normale supérieure in 1861 and graduated in physics in 1864, after which he taught at the Lycée de Nevers. In 1865 he joined the Paris Observatory, which was under the direction of Urbain Le Verrier, and in 1874 he went on an expedition to Nouméa in the Pacific to observe the transit of Venus. He obtained imprecise results and identified the source of the error to the instruments, the study of which was his doctoral thesis of 1876.

After strained relations with Le Verrier he sought the creation of an observatory in Lyon and briefly worked at the Faculty of Science in Lyon as a professor of astronomy. He made a visit to Utah in 1878 to observe a transit of Mercury, but snow prevented the study. He however visited several American observatories. In 1879 he became the director of the Lyon observatory. In 1892 he studied atmospheric electricity with a balloon ascent. He died suddenly at the observatory at the age of 70.
