= Charles André =

French architect

Charles André (1841–1928) was a French architect, son of François André and among the first in a long line of French architects in the André family. He specialized in Haussmannian architecture, a style which became extremely prominent throughout France in the 19th century. Beginning in 1901, he was a member of the École de Nancy.

Along with his son, Émile André, and Eugène Vallin, he was the architect of the Vaxelaire & Compagnie department store in Nancy, built in 1899-1901.

== Biography ==
Son of entrepreneur François André (1811-1904) and father of architect Émile André, Charles André was a departmental architect. He organized the decorative art exhibition held in Nancy in June 1894, which marked the beginnings of the École de Nancy.

Charles André, along with his sons Émile and Eugène Vallin, designed the Vaxelaire stores in Nancy, built between 1899 and 1901 at the corner of rue Saint-Jean and rue Raugraff. The building was listed as a Monument historique on February 25, 1994.
