= Maison Losseau =

House Losseau
- Maison Losseau
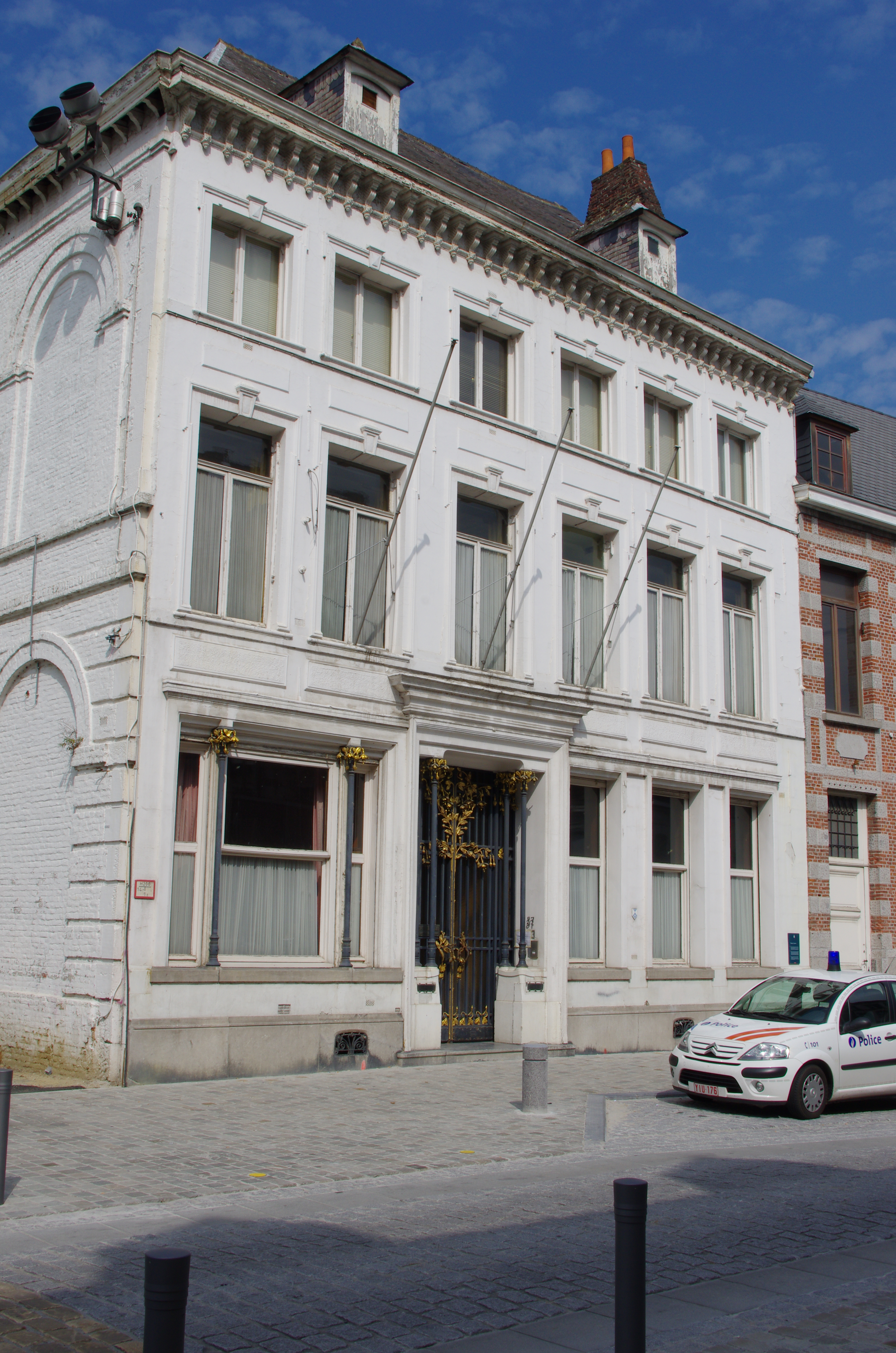
- Façade of the House Losseau
- Interactive map of the House Losseau area

General information
- Type: Private house
- Architectural style: Art Nouveau
- Location: Mons, Belgium
- Coordinates: 50°27′22.58″N 3°57′15.13″E

Design and construction
- Architects: Paul Saintenoy; Henri Sauvage

The Maison Losseau is an Art Nouveau private house located in Mons, Belgium. Dating from the 18th century, it was renovated in Art Nouveau style in the early 1900s at the request of Léon Losseau by Paul Saintenoy. It is listed on the list of the exceptional heritage site of Wallonia and since 2015 houses a center for the interpretation of Léon Losseau's collections and regional literature. The house is located at number 37 rue de Nimy in Mons, next to the courthouse.

== Description ==
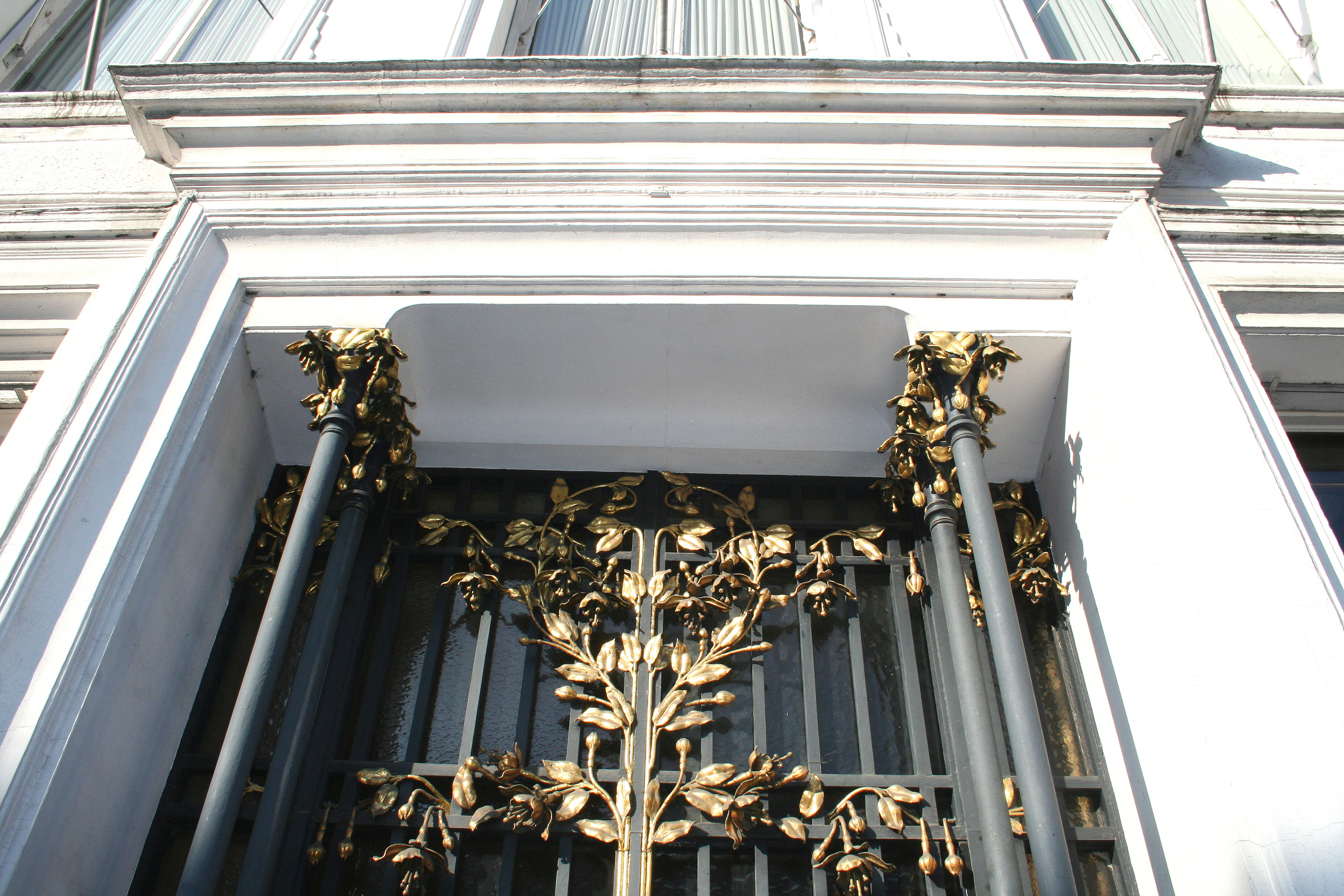
Entrance of the House Losseau

The neoclassical façade is covered with a white coating. The entrance door is detached, consisting of black cast iron columns decorated with golden leaves (1908) and fuchsia flowers of the same color. The house has very refined details. Each piece has a flower theme. The lobby has for example the theme of pink and orchid. A canopy with wooden beams overlooks the living room, which was decorated in 1911 by 15 pâte de verres of Amalric Walter representing the Belfry of Thuin and the river Sambre.

The facade, the roof and the interior of the house are classified as heritage monuments on the list of the exceptional heritage sites of Wallonia. Since 19 April 1982, the facade and the roofs are classified as heritage while the interior of the house was classified in 21 November 1983. In 2015, after a project launched in the early 2010s in anticipation of Mons 2015, a renovation began in 2011, the house reopened to the public in 2015. It houses a center for the interpretation of Léon Losseau's collections and a center for regional literature.

== History ==
The original house was built in the eighteenth century. It was acquired in 1873 by Charles Losseau, the father of Léon Losseau.

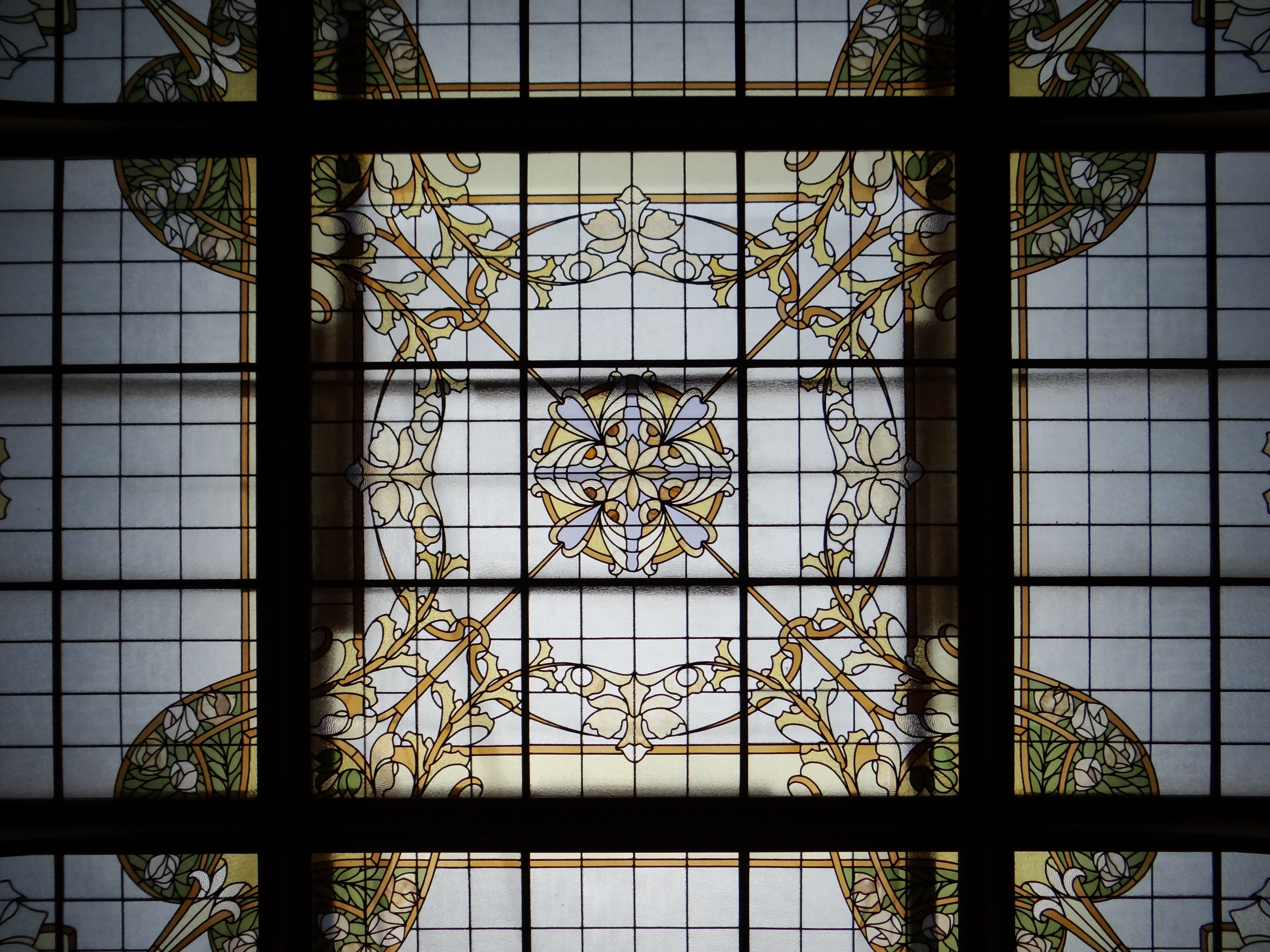
Glass roof in the living room. Glass and wooden beams, stylization of rosebushes and orchids. (Daum 1905)

It was completely renovated by Paul Saintenoy who was contacted in 1899 by Léon Losseau, lawyer, bibliophile, photographer and art patron. The finishing works were entrusted to Parisian architects Henri Sauvage and Charles Sarazin and continued by the Brussels architect Louis Sauvage. Paul Saintenoy began its work in 1900 and completed it in 1904, while the majority of decorations were made between 1905 and 1912. The renovation that ended in 1913 included the addition of electricity, central heating and an elevator. Once the renovation was completed, it became the first private house in Mons equipped with electricity and central heating.

During his life, Léon Losseau accumulated more than 100,000 books in his private library, mostly devoted to politics, but also to literature and poetry. A foundation was created in 1952 to manage his legacy.

== Collections ==
The Losseau house has the original edition of A season in hell by Arthur Rimbaud, discovered by Léon Losseau. An exhibition is dedicated to it.

== Gallery ==
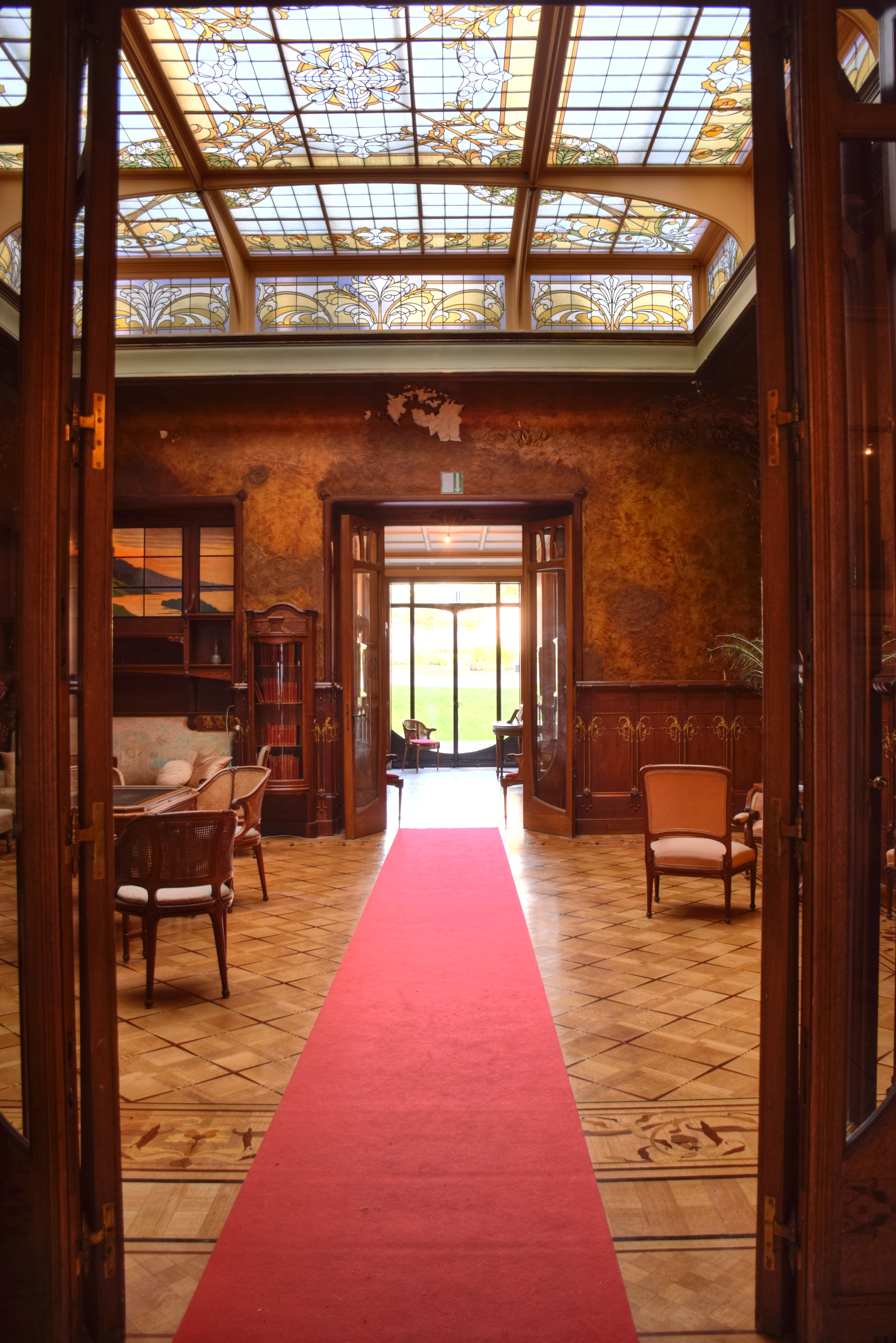
Lounge of the Maison Losseau.

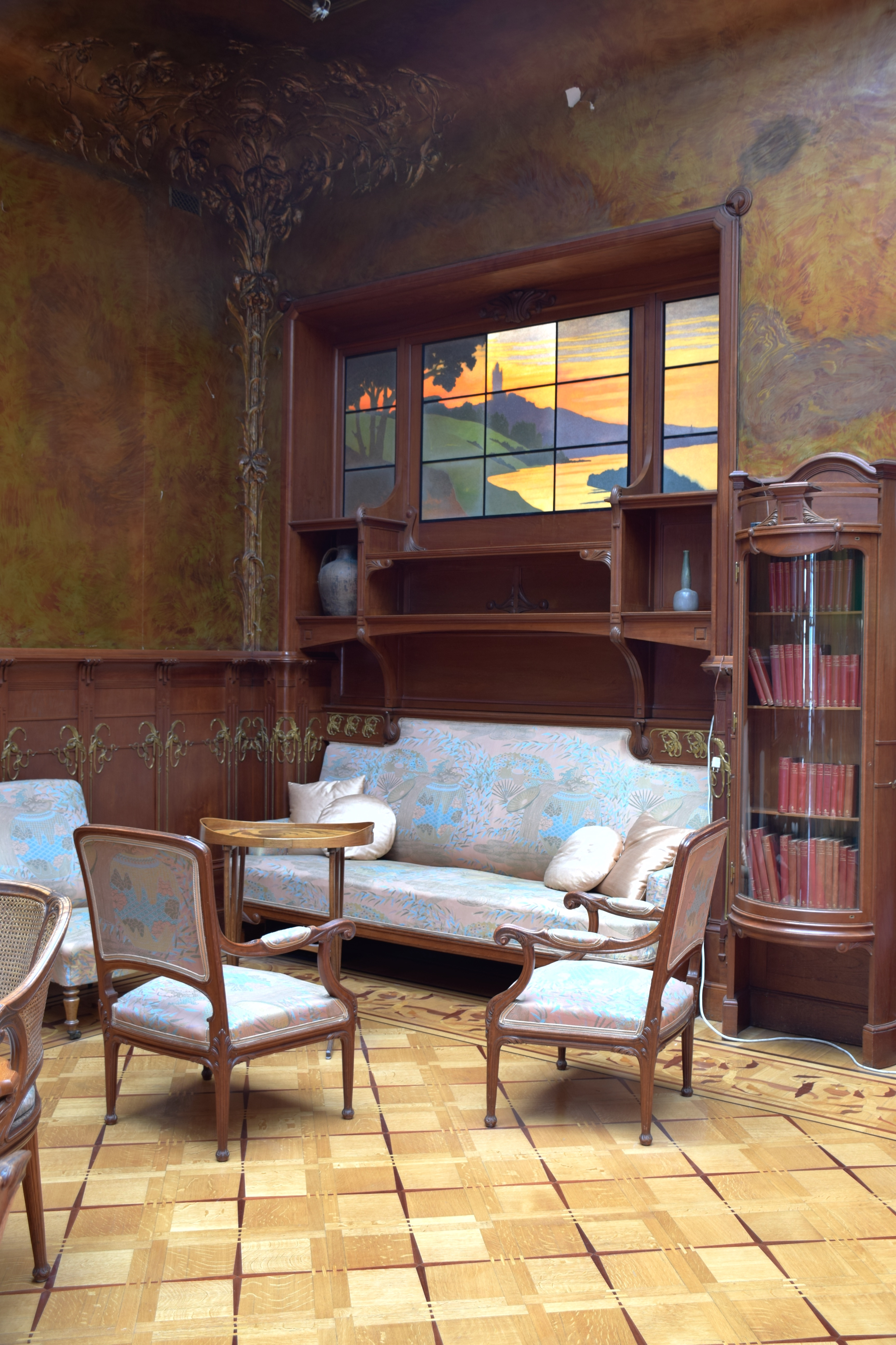
Lounge with mosaïcs by Amalric Walter.

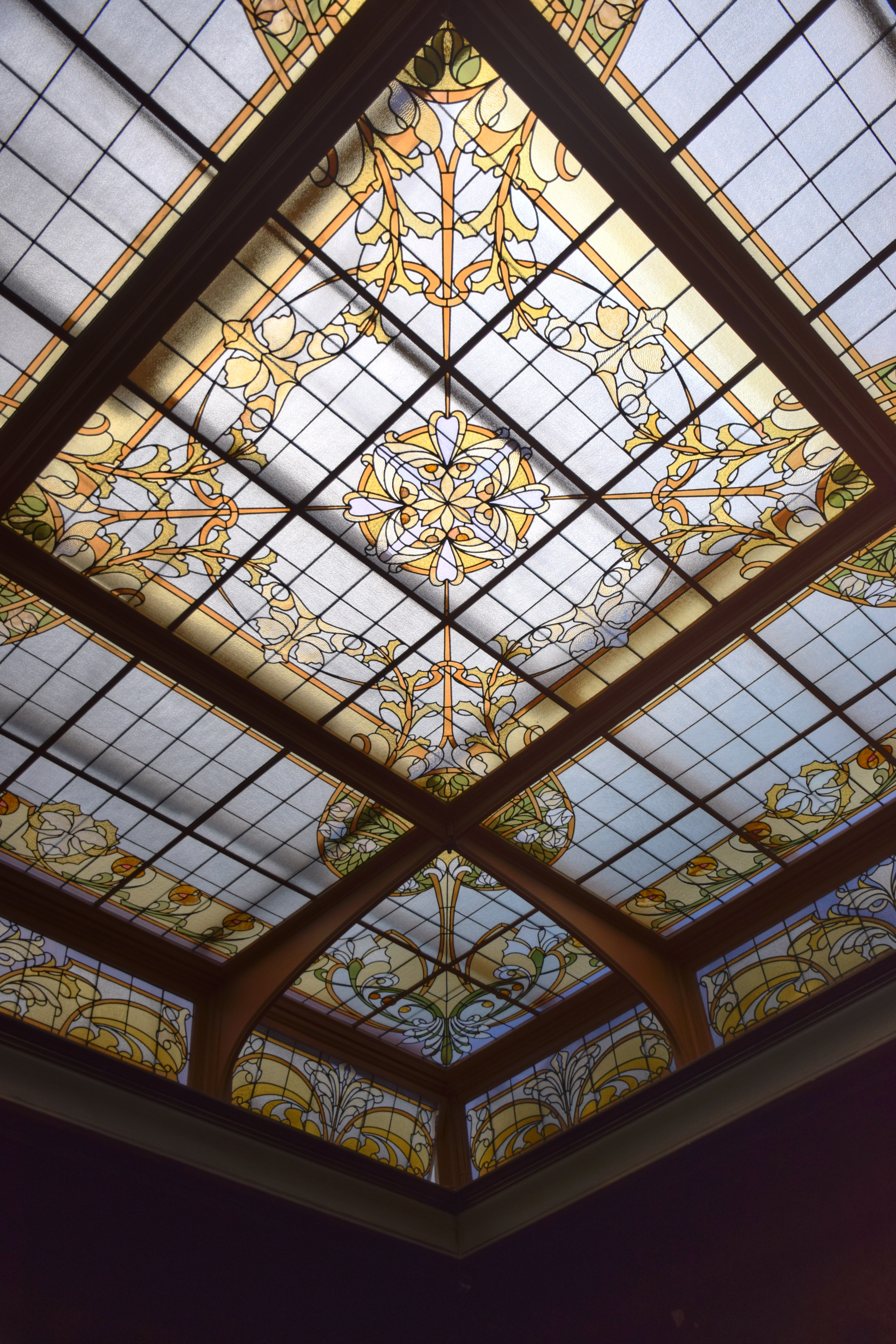
Glass roof in the lounge.

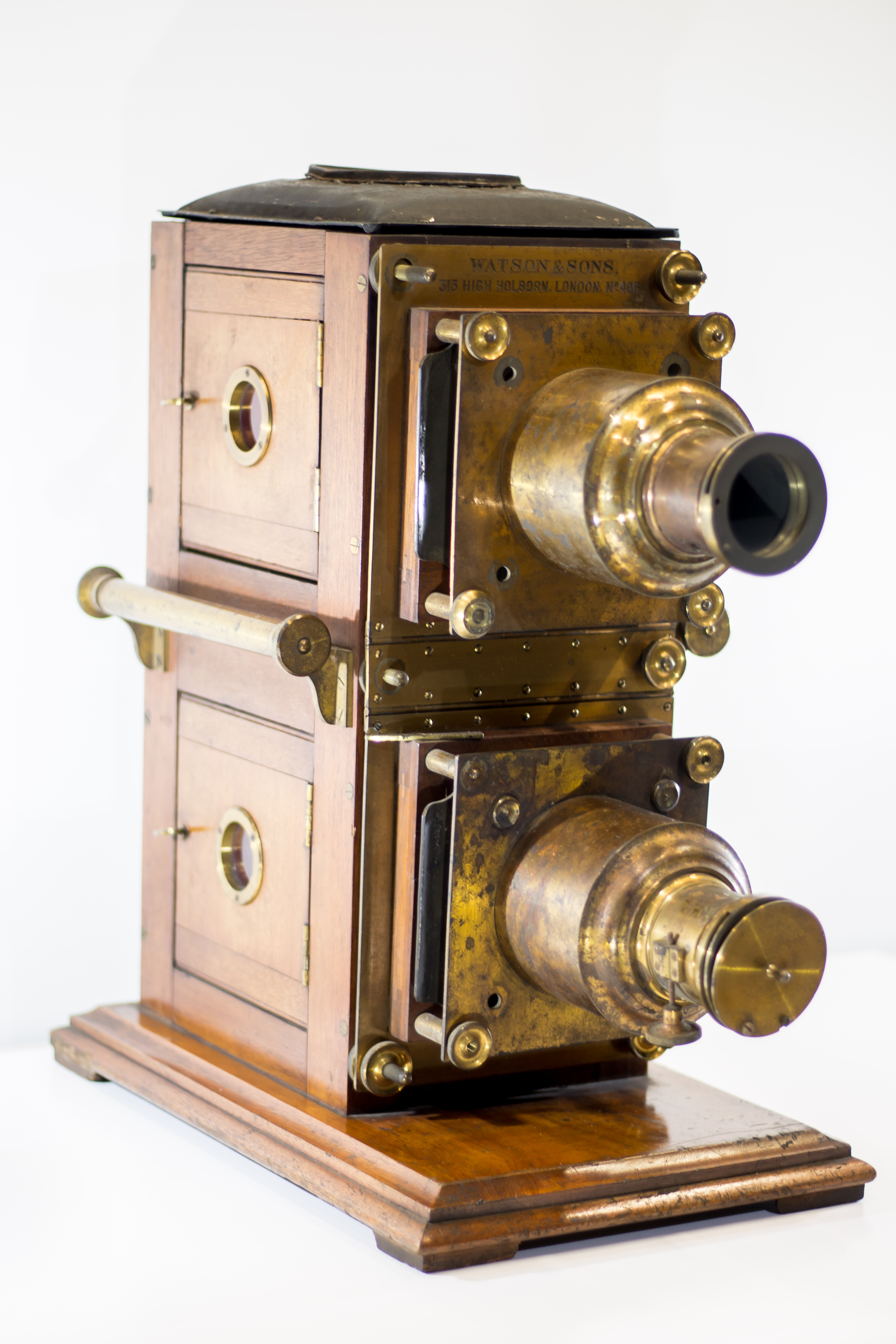
A double magic lantern, Léon Losseau's collections.

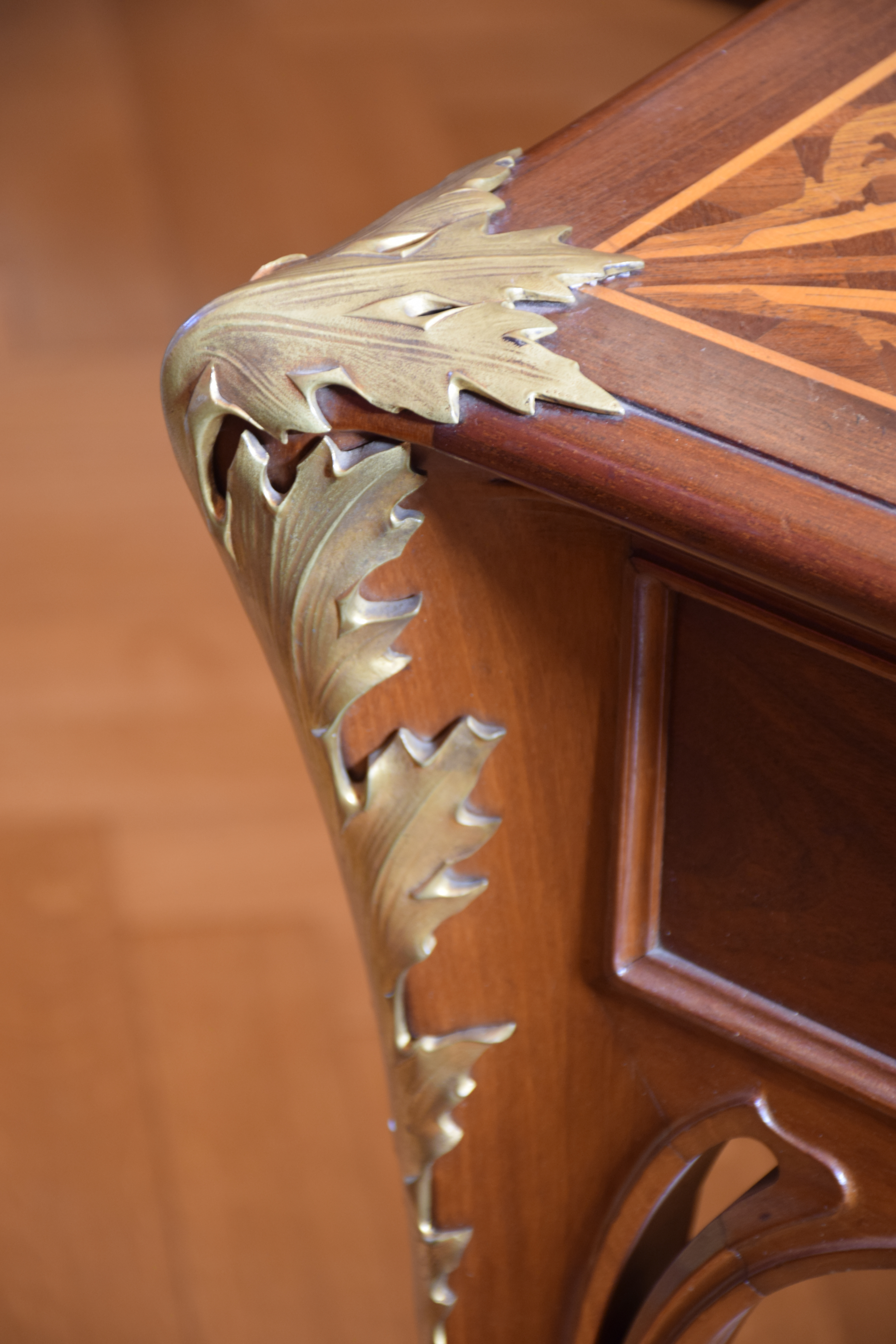
Decoration of a thistle leaf on a desk corner.
