= Henri Bergé =

French designer and illustrator (1870–1937)

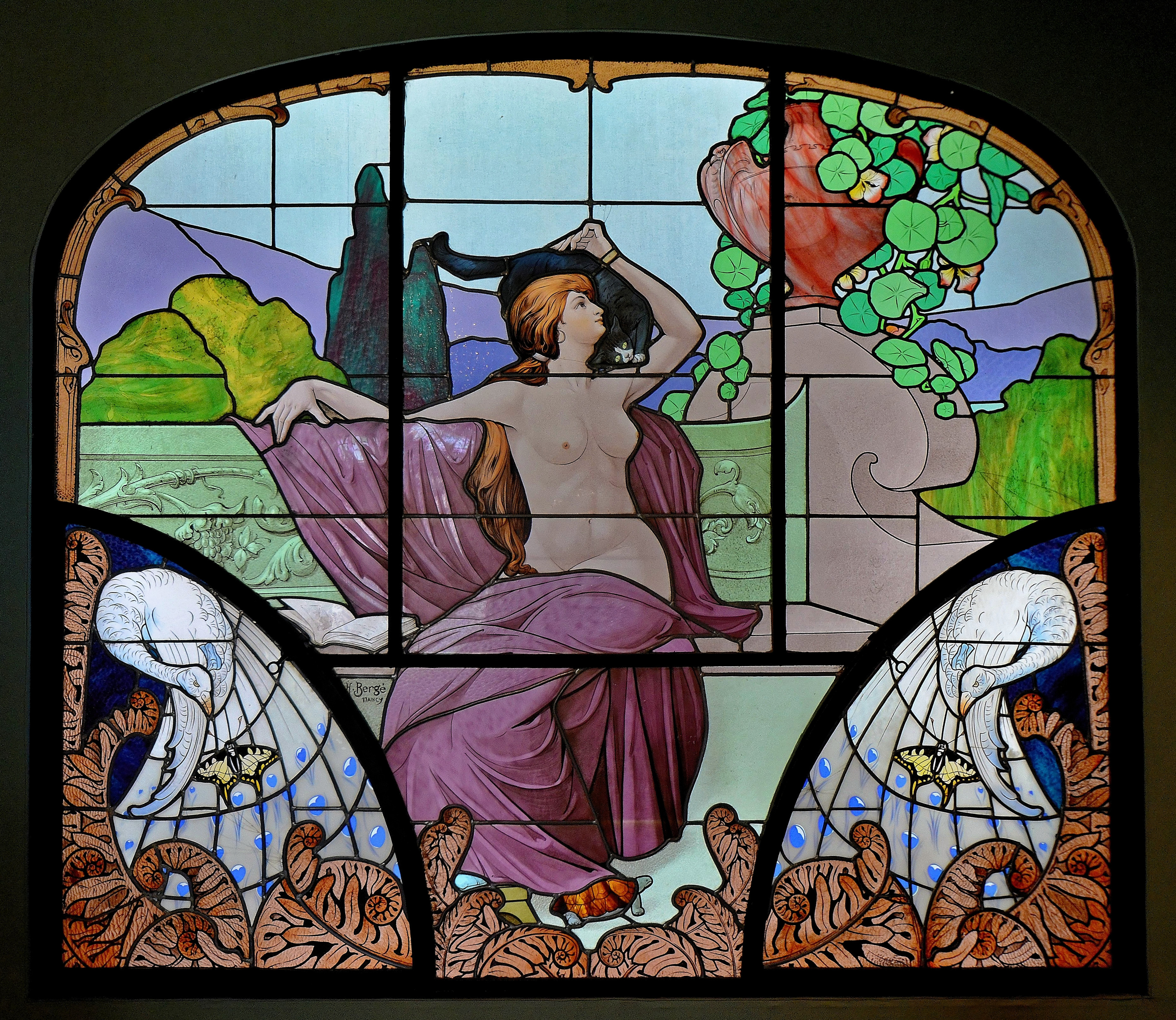
- Born: October 14, 1870; Diarville
- Died: November 26, 1937 (aged 67); Nancy
- Known for: Designer, illustrator, paintor
- Movement: Ecole de Nancy, Art Nouveau

Signature
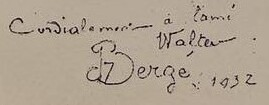

Henri Bergé (October 14, 1870 – October 26, 1937) was a French designer and illustrator who was part of the Art Nouveau movement.

== Biography ==
Son of a lace manufacturer, Henri Bergé received an artistic education at l'École des Beaux-Arts in Nancy, France, where he studied under the painter Jules Larcher.

In 1897, he joined Daum, a crystal studio based in Nancy, and became a leader in decorative glass. Bergé later became head decorator, replacing Jacques Gruber.

He is best known for his Floral Encyclopedia, which compiled his studies of plants used in Daum's manufacturing of art glass and crystal objects.

== École de Nancy ==
Henri Bergé was long associated with the École de Nancy, also known as "the provincial alliance of the industries of art," which emerged from the collaboration of key figures and promoters of Lorraine decorative arts. Émile Gallé served as its president, while Louis Majorelle, Antonin Daum, and Eugène Vallin were vice presidents. Upon its creation on February 13, 1901, Bergé was a member of the steering committee alongside other notable local figures, including Jacques Gruber, Louis Hestaux, Charles Fridrich, and Victor Prouvé.

Mainly known for his drawings, Bergé upheld the values of the École de Nancy and taught at several schools throughout his career. In 1894, he supervised lessons at the Daum modeling and drawing school. In 1895, he became co-director of the school, alongside Jacques Gruber.

Later, Bergé became the "Director of Decor Learning Lessons," succeeding Jacques Gruber as the master decorator at the Daum factory. He was responsible for creating pieces (designing both shapes and serial, as well as unique items) and for creating and overseeing the pouncing patterns.

Bergé worked with Antonin Daum until his death in 1937. In addition to his work at Daum, he was also a professor at various institutions. He taught at the École des Beaux-Arts and the École Professionnelle de l'Est in Nancy, a school for applied arts that aimed to compete with the Beaux-Arts schools, where teaching no longer met the needs of industrial art. During World War I, Bergé also taught at the Henri-Poincaré High School.

== Art Nouveau ==
=== Techniques and nature observation ===
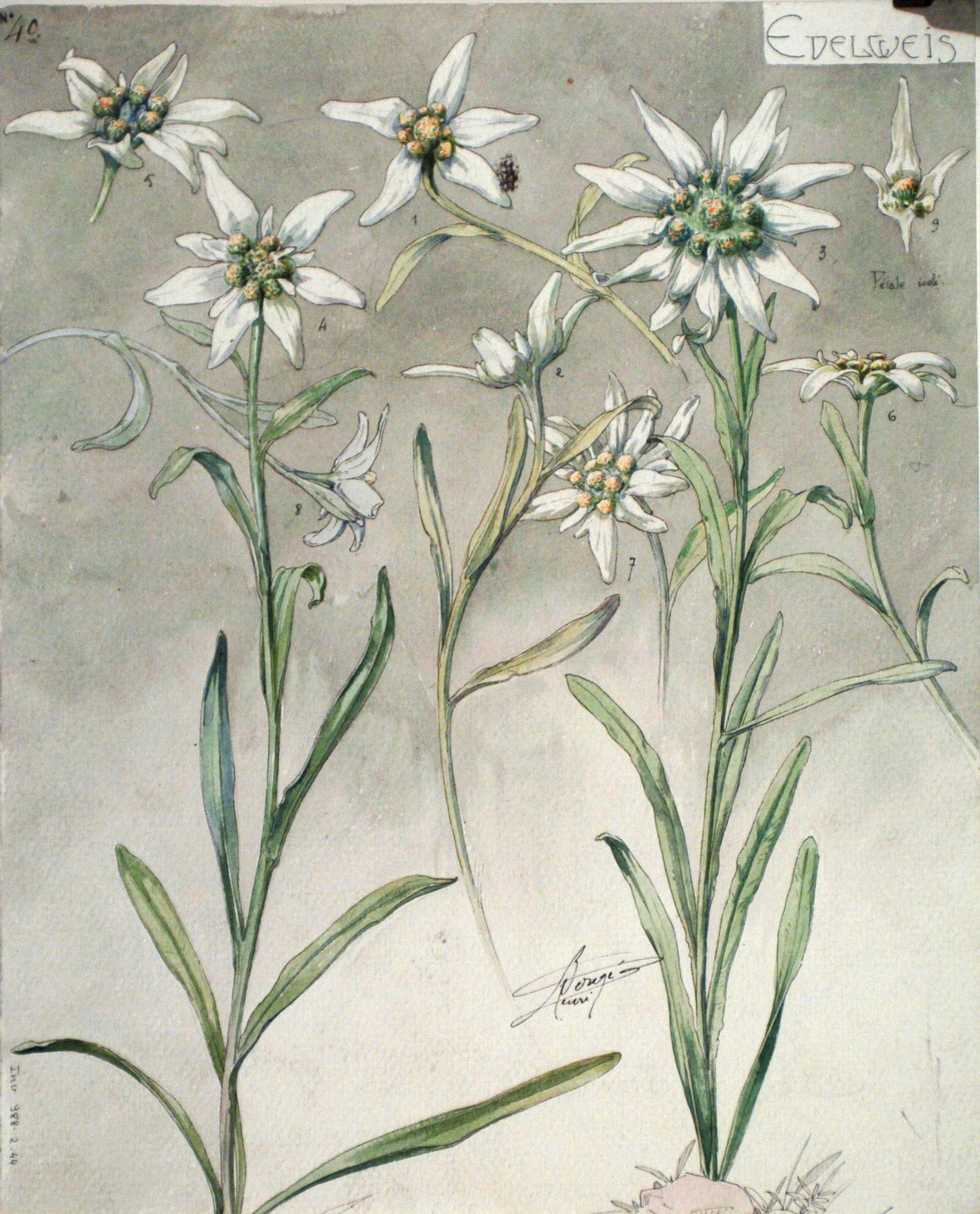
Edelweiss flowers study, Henri Bergé, 20th century, musée de l'École de Nancy.

Bergé's works demonstrate a precise study of plants. Christophe Bardin describes Henri Bergé's observational work as "a direct observation of nature through traveling the surrounding countryside or using the botanical gardens and greenhouses of Nancy to discover more exotic species, followed by a drawing process."

Bergé often visited the botanical garden of Sainte Catherine and the greenhouse of the nurseryman Victor Lemoine in Nancy. Additionally, Bergé was a member of the Central Horticultural Society of Nancy. This society played a major role for the artists of the École de Nancy, who were strongly influenced by nature.

Much like some members of the École de Nancy, such as Louis Majorelle and Eugène Corbin, Bergé also used photography alongside his drawings to aid his creative work. This practice allowed him to create models with great naturalism. The photographs could have been taken either outdoors or in a studio, for example, by isolating a plant against a neutral background. A series of photographic plates were discovered in the house of Suzanne Bergé, the artist's daughter.

=== Daum studio ===
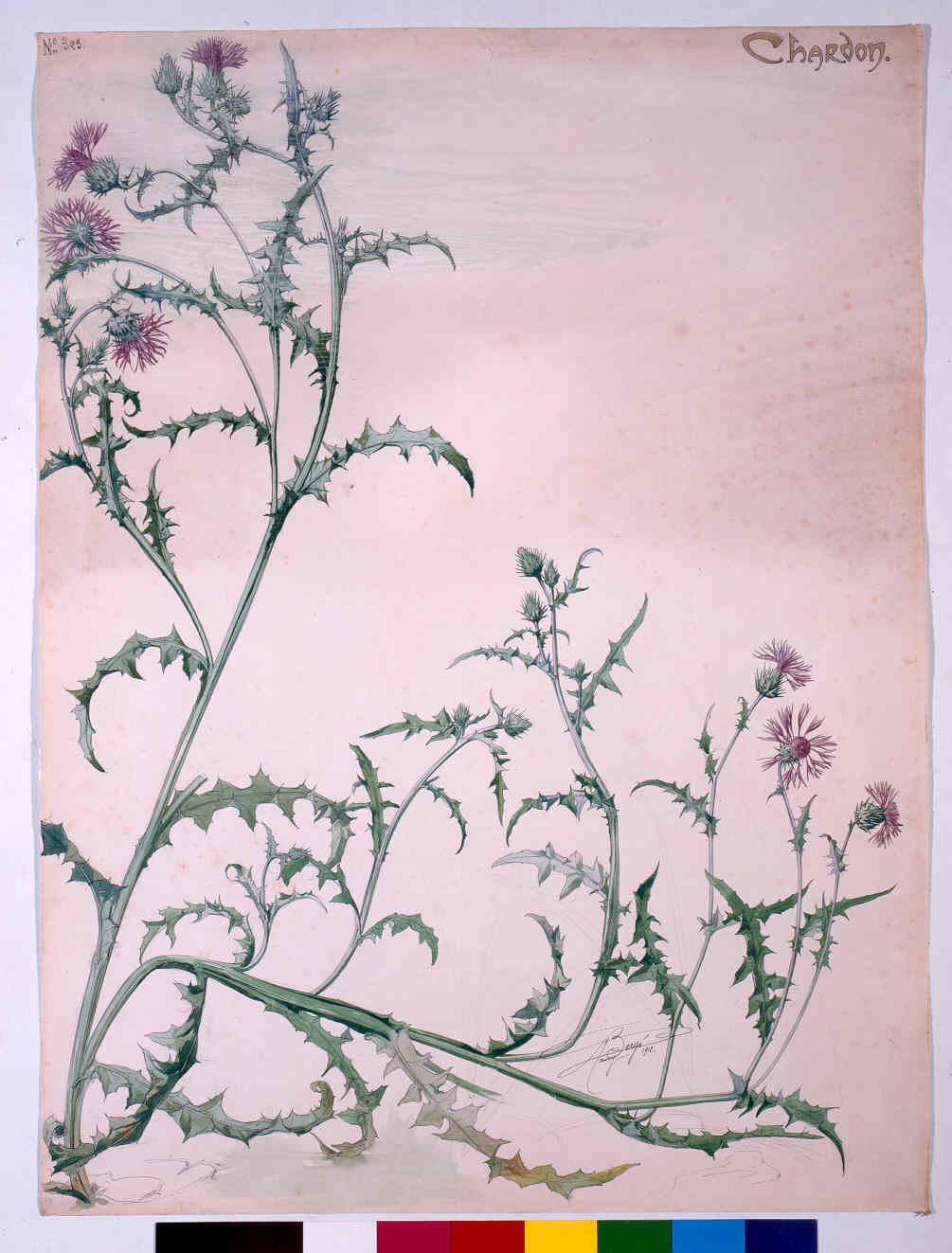
Thistle study, Henri Bergé, Musée de l'École de Nancy.

As the artistic director of the factory, Henri Bergé was an essential collaborator at Daum. Daum's goal was to produce decorative pieces in a more industrial manner by mass-producing patterns. Bergé developed a unique method for affixing his drawings to the pieces: by creating pouncing patterns. On tracing paper, he adapted reusable pouncing patterns for the factory's decorators. They could then use these patterns as guidelines while creating the vases. This practical and economical technique allowed for the mass production of Bergé's designs.

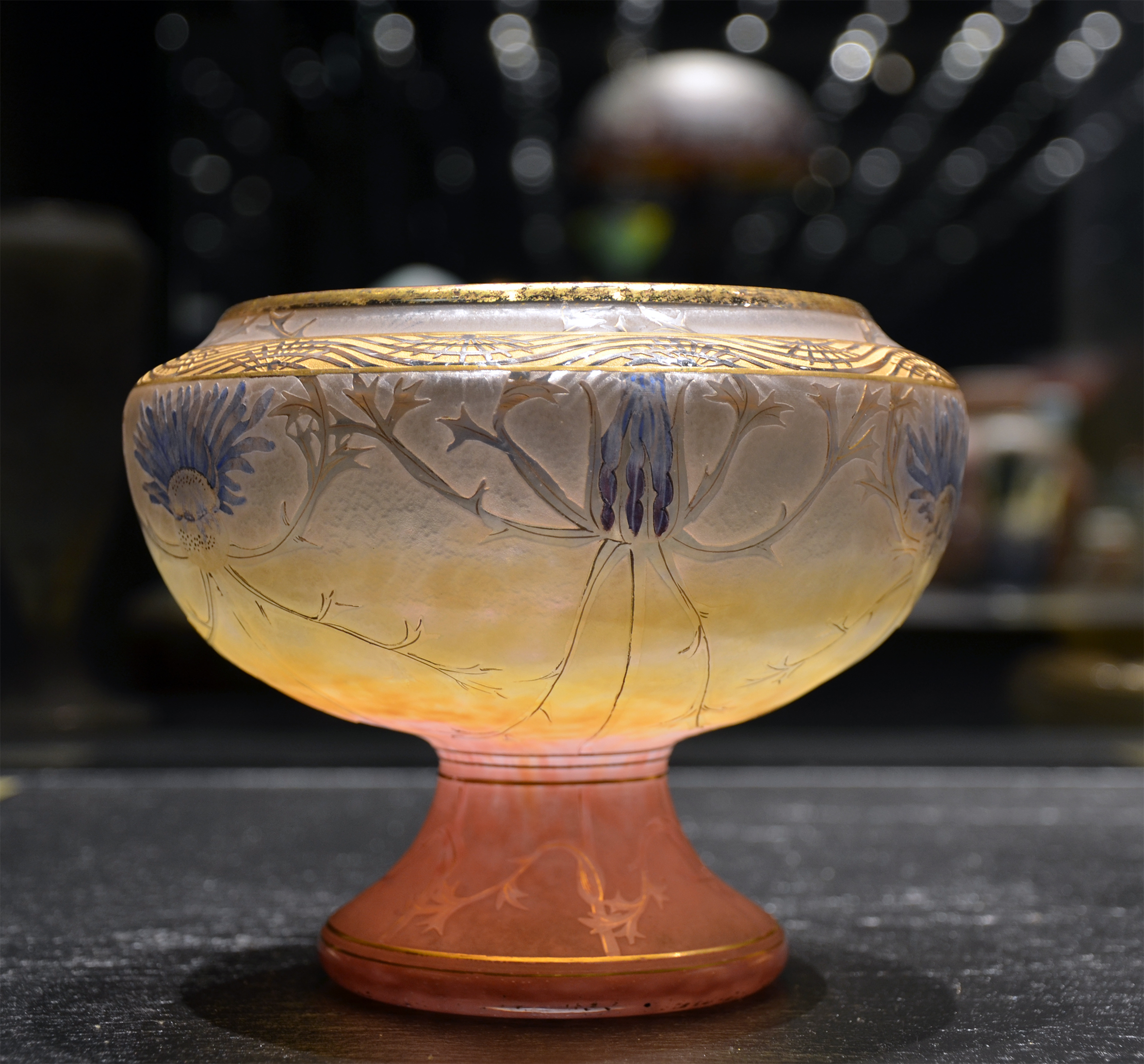
Reuse an example of Bergé's motifs for objects created by Daum. On this vase created by Daum in 1902 and kept at the musée de l'École de Nancy, we can find the thistle motif.

The diffusion of Bergé's models was also incorporated into his lessons at the Daum School. It was through the study of leaves and flowers created by the artist that the students learned how to draw. The same leaf and flower study techniques were used at other institutions where the professor taught.

The works designed by Bergé represented the majority of the objects displayed by Daum during the 1900 Universal Exhibition in Paris.

In his 40 years of activity at the Daum factory, Bergé built an extensive collection of plants and floral motifs, which he compiled in his Floral Encyclopedia. This encyclopedia served as a source of motifs for the Daum factory until the 1920s.

=== Floral Encyclopedia ===
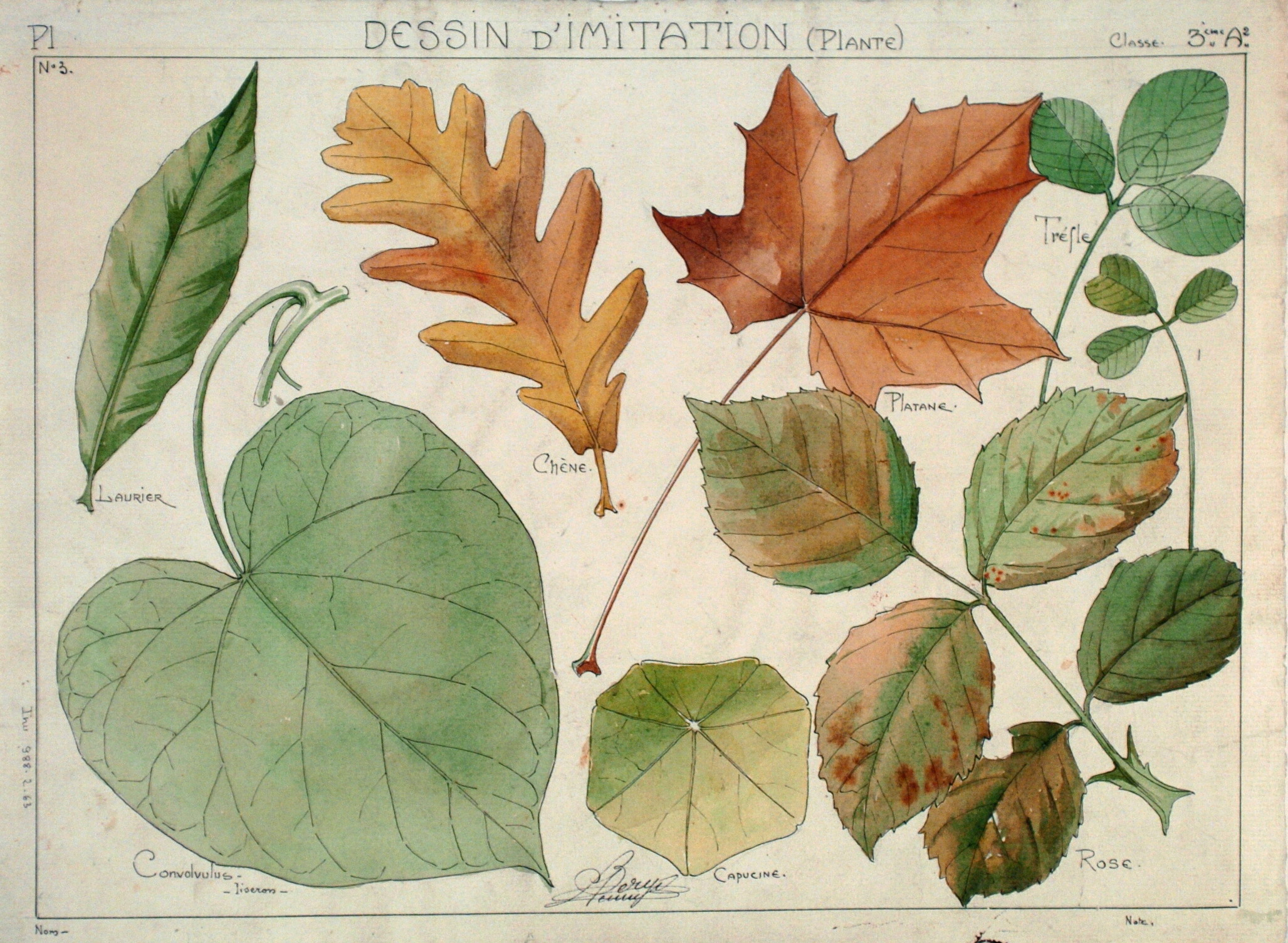
Study of various leaves, Henri Bergé, musée de l'École de Nancy

Bergé's drawings reflect the period's fascination with Japonisme, as well as an appreciation for nature and the use of volute and arabesque shapes.

Bergé demonstrated dedicated scientific rigor in his work. His art features numerous details, such as fruits, seeds, and even the different stages of flower blossoming. Some plates are occasionally accompanied by scientific notes and descriptions.

Even though Bergé's work faithfully reflected nature, he never considered it a true work of art. It did not aim for the completeness of an encyclopedia. Its primary purpose was industrial: to create a stylistic foundation that would provide "beautiful functional models" for Daum's workers.

=== Collaboration with Amalric Walter. ===
Bergé collaborated with Amalric Walter, who used his naturalist repertoire to create glass pastes. The production of Amalric Walter, heavily inspired by Bergé's work at Daum, was characterized by Art Nouveau pieces that highlighted fauna and flora.

Bergé did not hesitate to cast insects and small animals for his collaboration with Amalric Walter.

This collaboration was so significant that in 1925, during the International Exhibition of Modern Decorative and Industrial Arts in Paris, Henri Bergé received a gold medal for his work with Walter.

Examples of works created during this collaboration

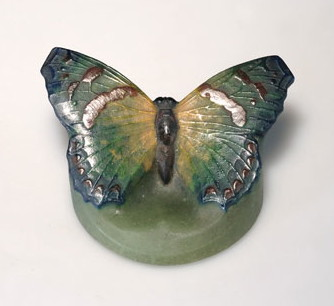
Butterfly paperweight, Amalric Walter and Henri Bergé, ca.1925

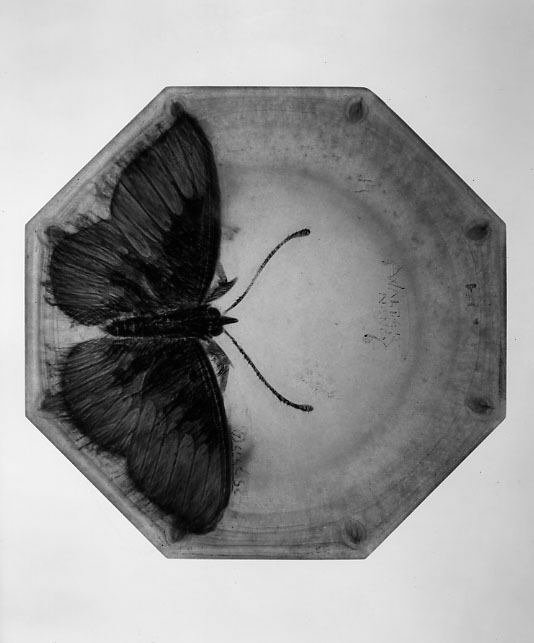
Plate, Amalric Walter and Henri Bergé, ca.1919-1925, glass, New-York, MET

== Works ==
- Henri Bergé produced numerous advertisements (e.g. for the Maison d'art de Lorraine) printed by Albert Begeret in Nancy, and subsequently printed by the Modern Graphic Art.
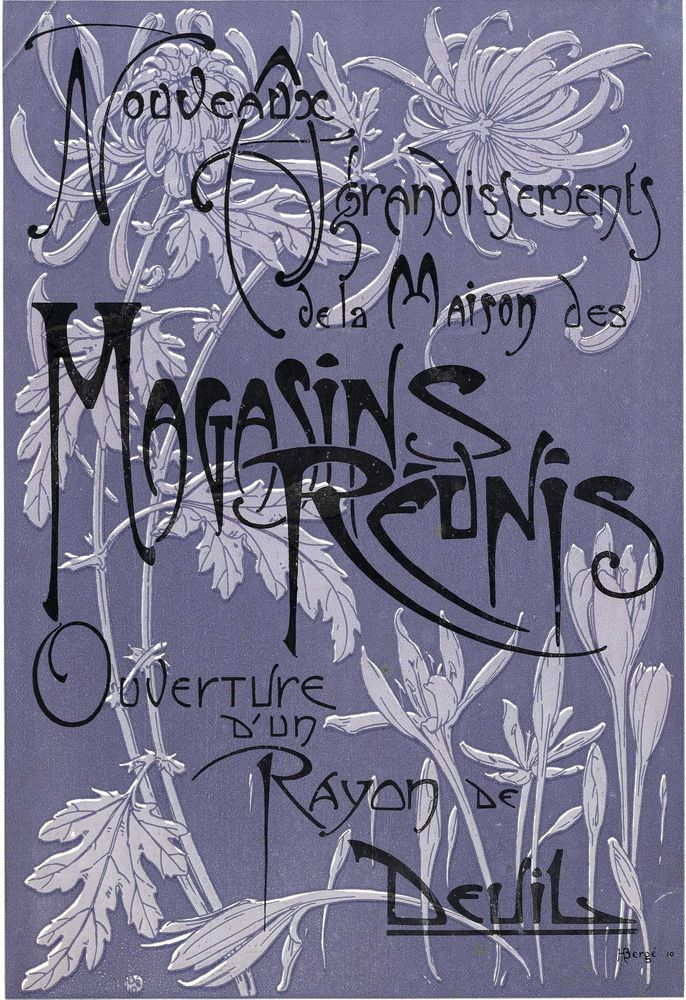
  An advertisement which promoted the opening of a mourning department at the Magasins Réunis in Nancy, by Henri Bergé, 20th century, Nancy, Palace of the Dukes of Lorraine.
- He also illustrated advertisements for the old French stores chain called the Magasins réunis in Nancy.
- Bergé created several Art Nouveau stained-glass windows. Some were advertising stained glass windows such as in the brewery located on the ground floor of the Cure d'Air Trianon in Malzéville. The window panels presented the major beverage brands sold at the brewery. Other stained-glass were more symbolic works of art, such as La Lecture preserved in the collection of the musée de l'École de Nancy.
- Bergé also collaborated with Amalric Walter, a French glass-maker, and gave him several models, which Walter then used to make handcrafted glass pastes.
- Henri Bergé produced watercolor studies which represented plants. These studies were grouped together in his Floral Encyclopedia. A collection of 85 of Bergé's drawings are kept at the musée de l'École de Nancy. It was donated to the museum by the Pont-à-Mousson company in 1988
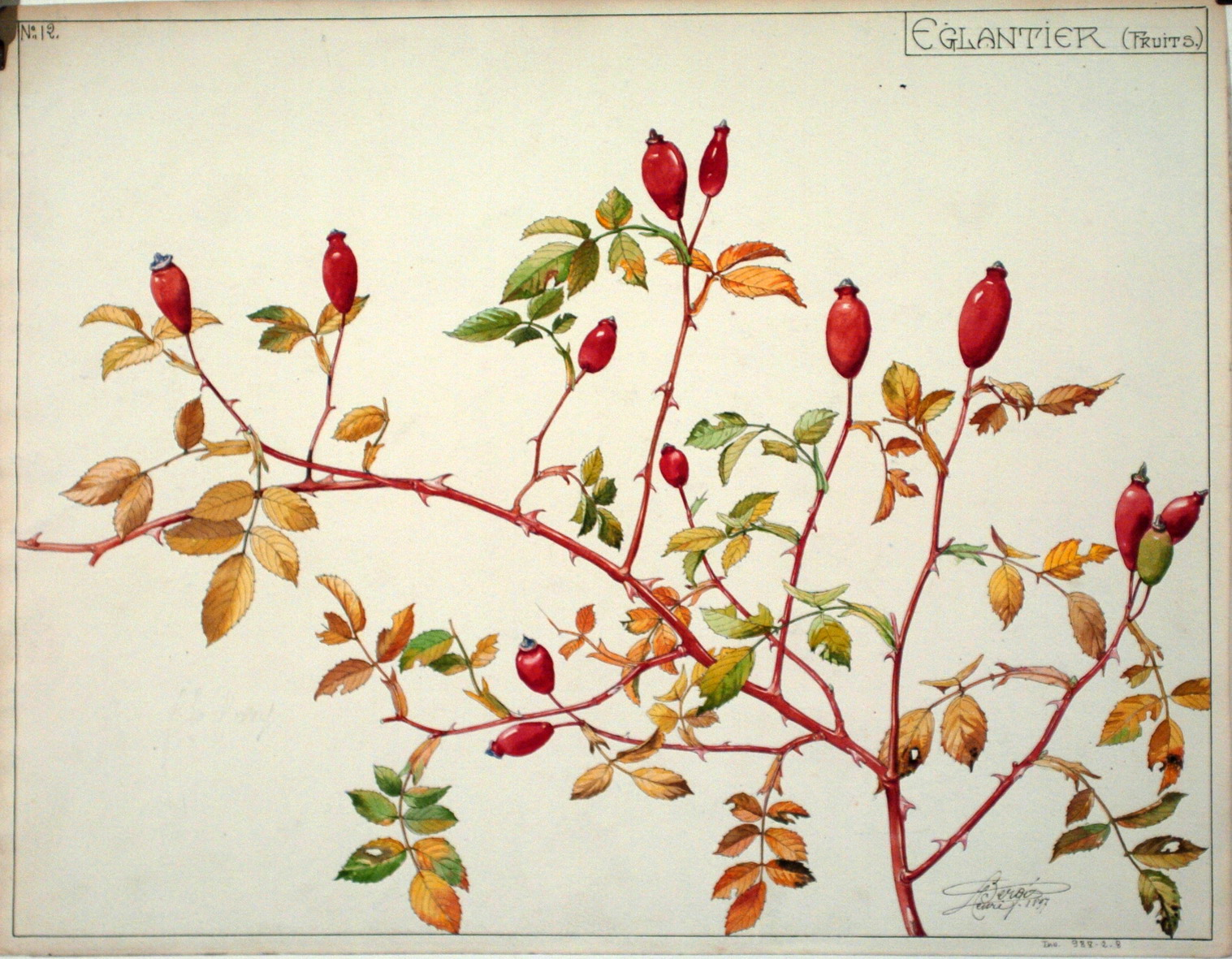
Rosehip fruits study, Henri Bergé, musée de l'École de Nancy

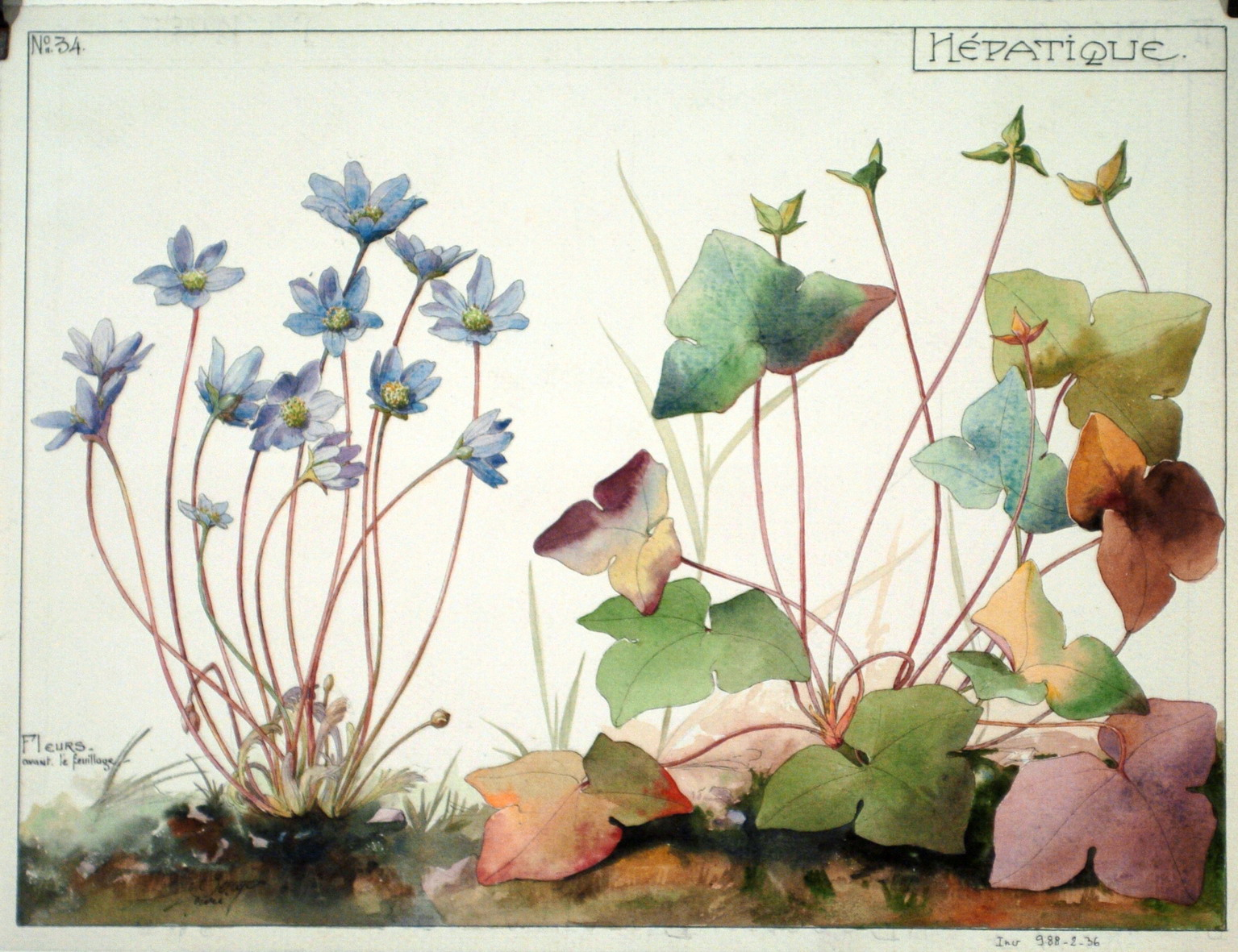
Hepatica study, Henri Bergé, Musée de l'École de Nancy

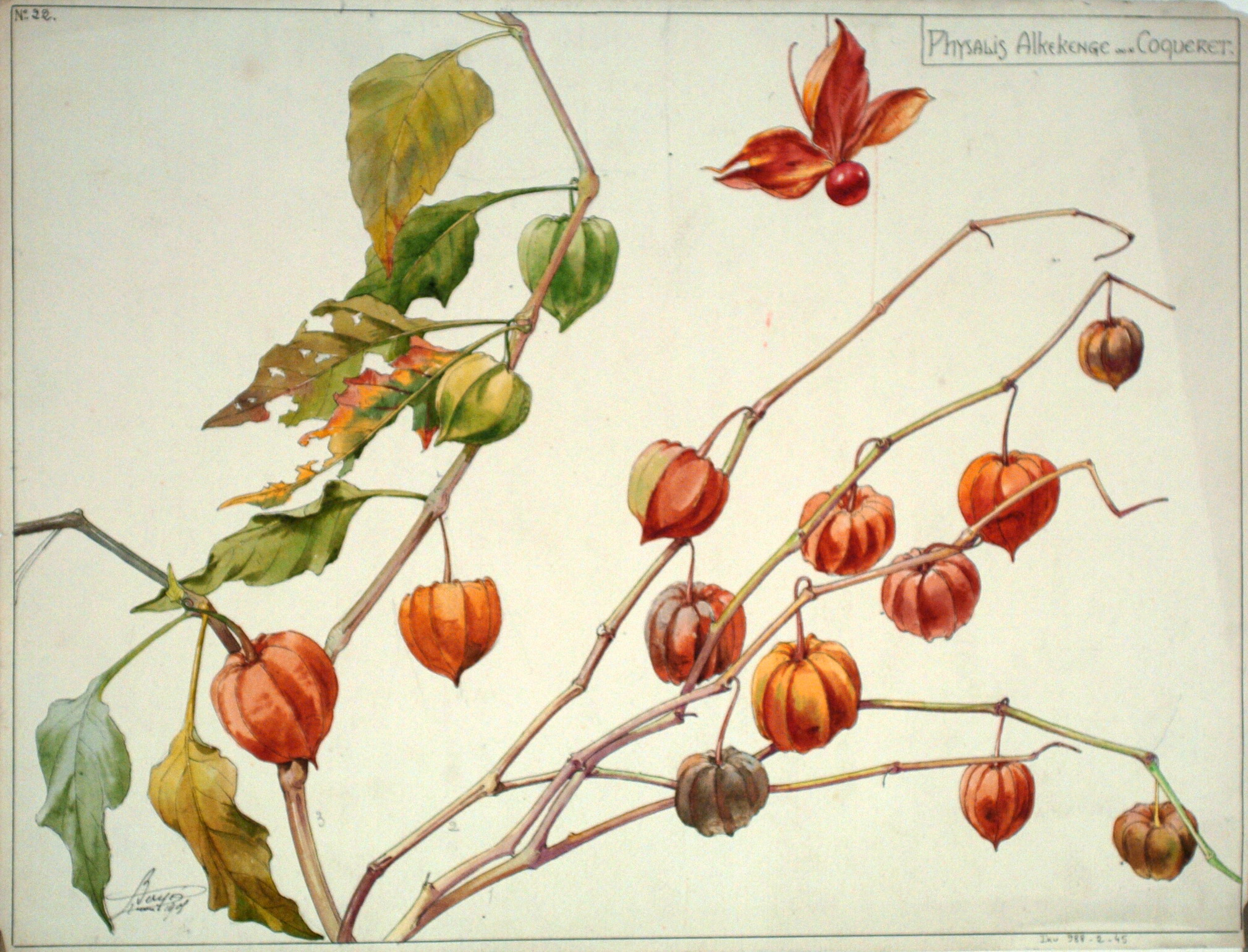
Alkekengi study, Henri Bergé, 1905, musée de l'École de Nancy

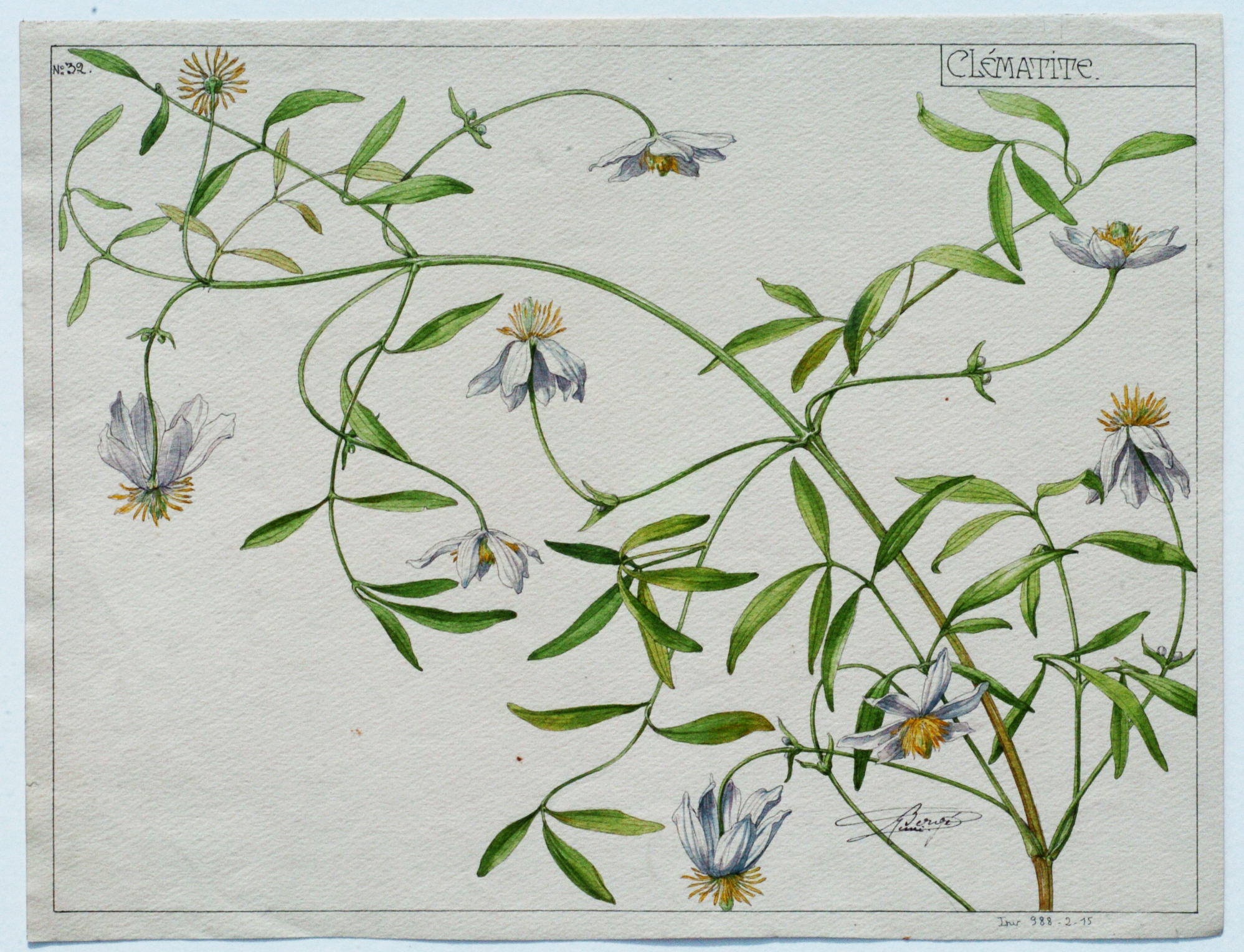
Clematis study n°32, Henri Bergé, musée de l'École de Nancy

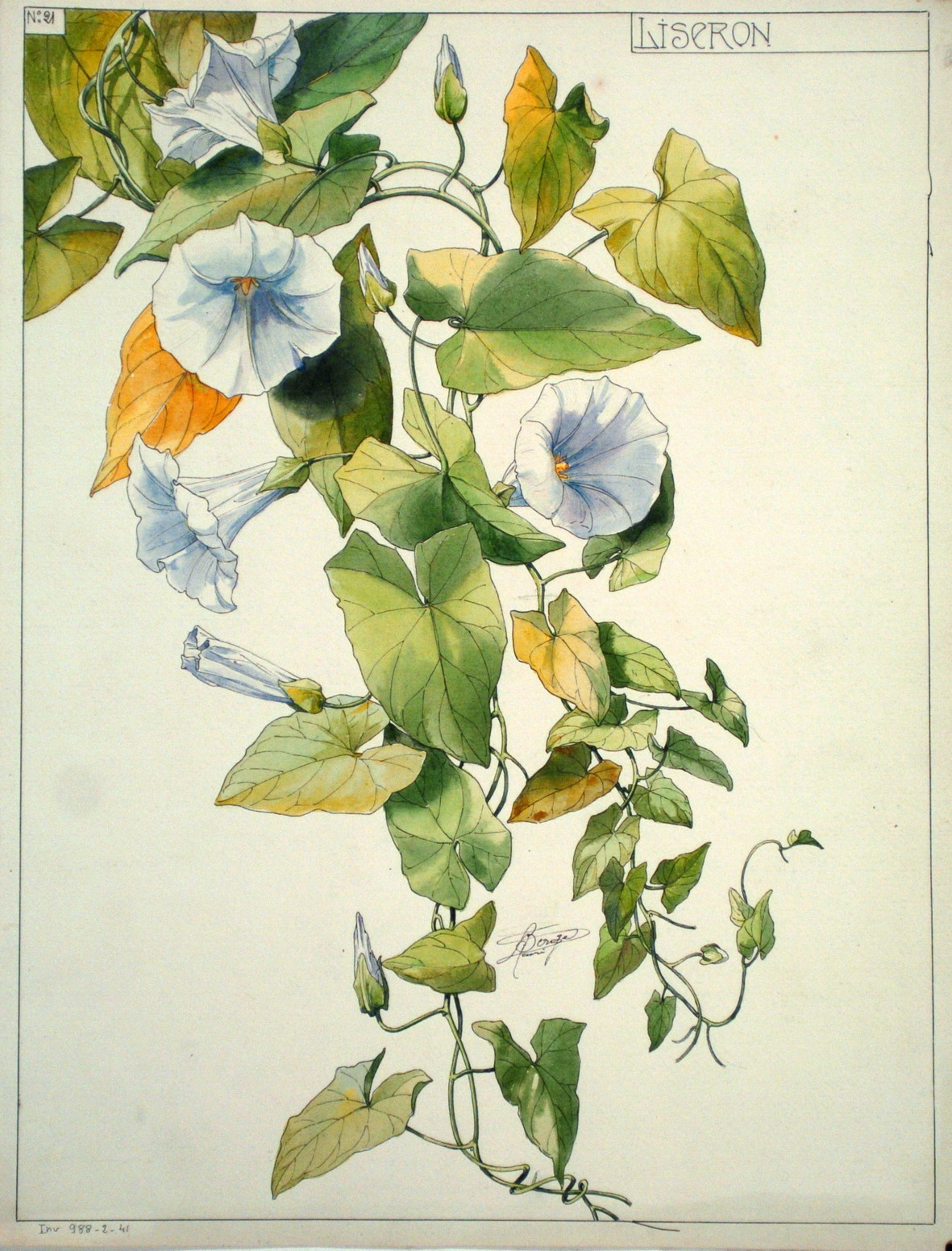
Morning glory flower study n°62, Henri Bergé, Musée de l'École de Nancy
