= Cyril Kongo =

French painter

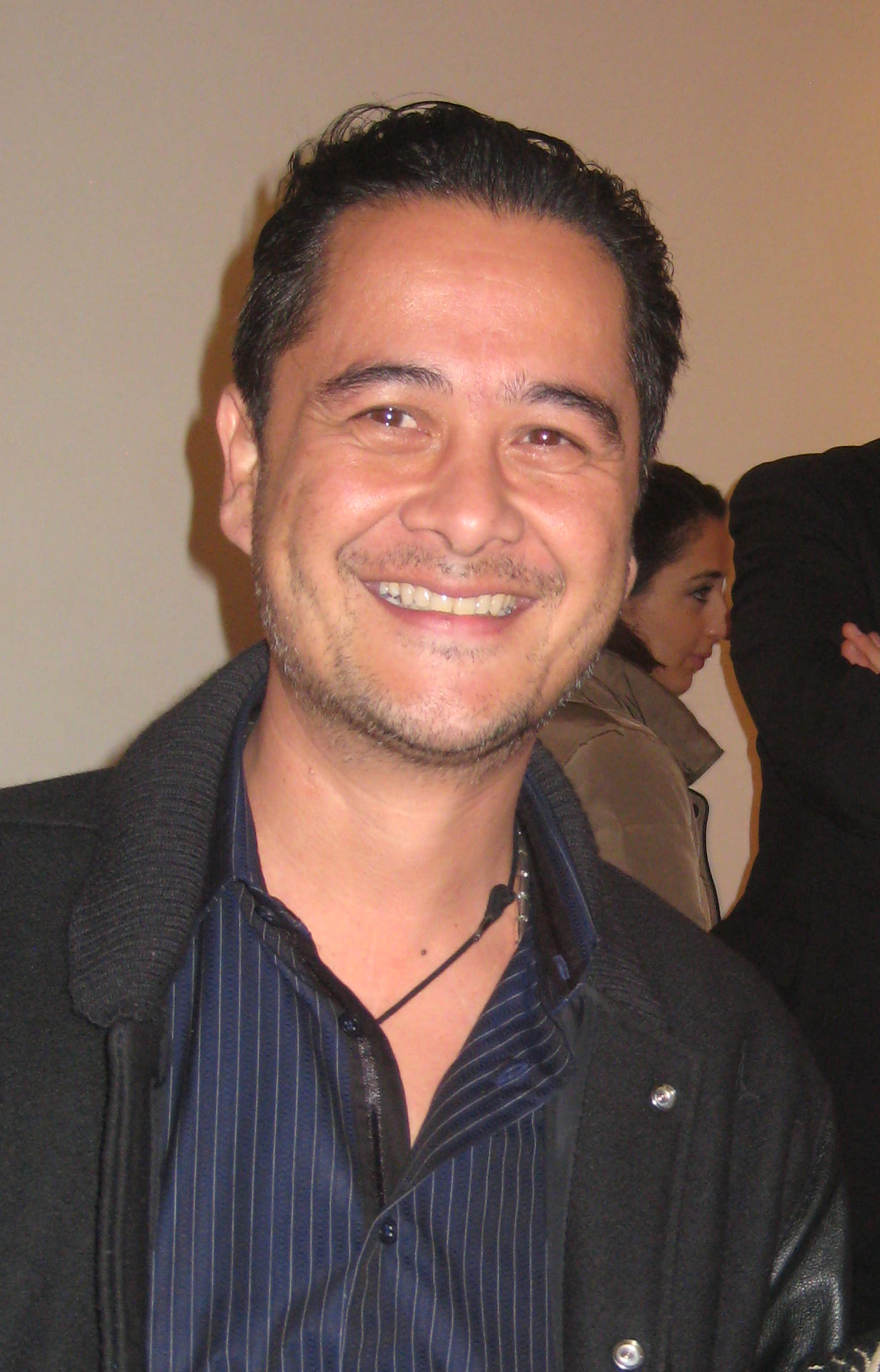
- Cyril Kongo, 2016
- Born: Cyril Phan; 1969 (age 56–57); Toulouse (France)
- Other name: Kongo
- Movement: Street art (graffiti)
- Website: cyrilkongo.com

Cyril Kongo, also known as Kongo, was born in 1969 as Cyril Phan in Toulouse, France. He is a French painter and graffiti artist.

== Biography ==
Born of a Vietnamese father and a French mother, Cyril Phan spent his early childhood in Vietnam until the fall of Saigon in 1975. During his adolescence, he lived for several years in Brazzaville in the Republic of the Congo, which inspired his artist name, Cyril Kongo.

In 1986, he began tagging Parisian walls to set his mark. In 1988, he joined the MAC crew, a group of Parisian graffiti artists with whom he painted from 1989 to 2001 monumental murals, particularly in the United States where he collaborated with New-York graffiti artists TATS cru.

The director ATN devotes a documentary, Trumac, de Paris à South-Bronx (Trumac, from Paris to South-Bronx) to these imposing works (including a wall about 50 meters long by 8 meters high). Kongo also appears in a 2004 film shot by documentary filmmaker Marc-Aurèle Vecchione Writers, 20 ans de graffiti à Paris 1983-2003 (Writers, 20 years of graffiti in Paris, 1983-2003).

In 2002, with the Mac Crew, Kongo launched Kosmopolite, the first international graffiti festival in France, sponsored by the suburban city of Bagnolet where he resides. In 2011, Kosmopolite went worldwide with the Kosmopolite art tour, a yearly event in major graffiti hubs : Amsterdam (Netherlands), Brussels (Belgium), Casablanca (Morocco), Sao Paulo (Brazil), Santiago (Chile), Jkakarta (Indonesia). Having reach its primary objective, dissociating graffiti art from its connotation of vandalism, Kosmopolite has been committed since 2011 to transmit its knowledge and the history of the movement by organizing free workshops of initiation to the urban arts, at first to young people and now also to adults.

Thanks to the art studio of Kosmopolite, called Narvaland, Cyril Kongo, according to his formula "leaped out from the street to the studio" (see page 30 of the book devoted to this art). His works are presented in galleries and exhibitions.

In early 2020, an exhibit on the roof of Paris la Défense Grande Arche is entirely devoted to Cyril Kongo. In 2024, a solo exhibition of his artwork is featured at Museum Wawe in Seoul.

== Art ==
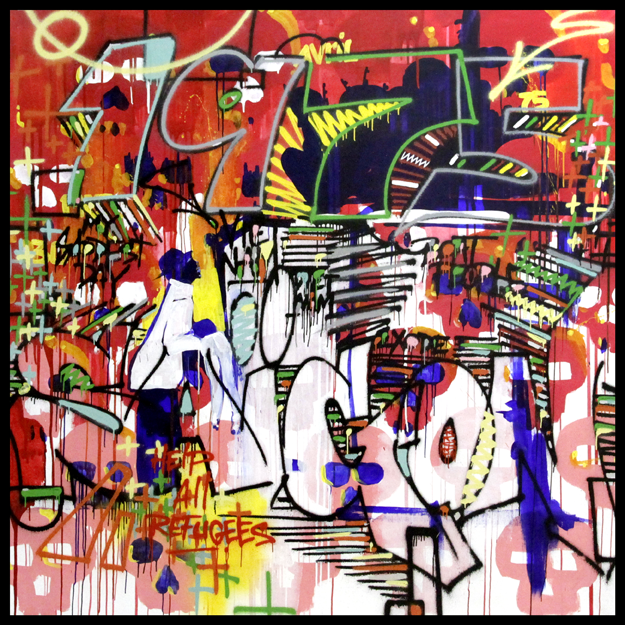

Kongo's art is based on lettering, i.e. large colorful spray-painted letters, typical of the writing trend of urban art.

During his ephemeral art period (1986-2000), Kongo painted huge frescoes, on walls and various other supports, in Paris and its suburbs, but also throughout the world. The only remaining traces of his works of this period are photos and films.

From 2000 on, Kongo started painting on perennial surfaces. In 2009, two of his paintings were displayed in the Grand Palais museum in Paris as part of the exhibition "Tags in the Grand Palais" organised by art collector Alain-Domininique Gallizia. In 2011, Claude Kunetz, a Parisian art dealer, organised Kongo's first solo exhibition "De la rue jaillit la lumière" (Light springing from the street). From then on, worldwide exhibitions have been numerous. The frontispiece of the Cité des Outre-mer in Paris is a mural by Kongo.

With this recognition, prestige brands began to commission Kongo for the creation of luxury goods, including a silk scarf (a carré) with Hermès in 2011; a pâte de verre spray-paint can with crystal manufacturer Daum in 2016, and a watch with Richard Mille. In 2018, he is awarded the AD Great design award by Architectural Digest for one of the enamel plates he painted for six of the French luxury brand La Cornue stoves (sold $3000,000). The same year, he is asked by Karl Lagerfeld to design for the Chanel Metropolitan Museum of Art show. In 2021, Airbus partner with Cyril Kongo to design the cabin of their business jet ACJ TwoTwenty.In 2026, the artist hand-paints a series of five unique Rolls-Royce « Black Badge Cullinan by Cyril Kongo »..

== Books ==
- Kongo, éditions Cercle d'art (2016) (in English and in French). An art book entirely devoted to graffiti artist Cyril Kongo.
- James T. Murray, Karla T. Murray, Broken Windows : graffiti NYC , Gingko press Inc. (2003). Revised edition in 2010.
- Stéphane Corréard and Daëna Phan Van Song, Cyril Kongo, (in English and in French), Narvaland editions, 2019. An art book entirely devoted to graffiti artist Cyril Kongo.

== See also ==
- Street art
- Graffiti
