= Amalric Walter =

French glass artist specializing in pâte de verre (1870-1959)

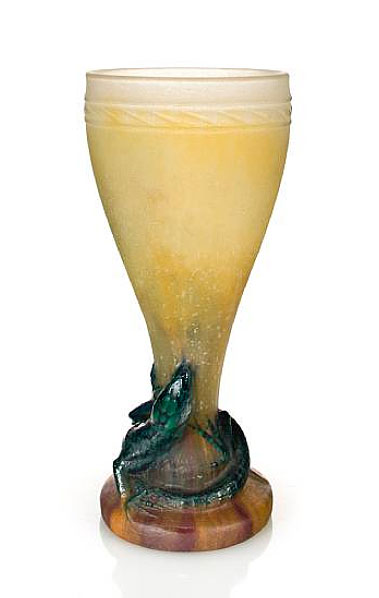
Vase au lézard, c. 1925, h: 21 cm

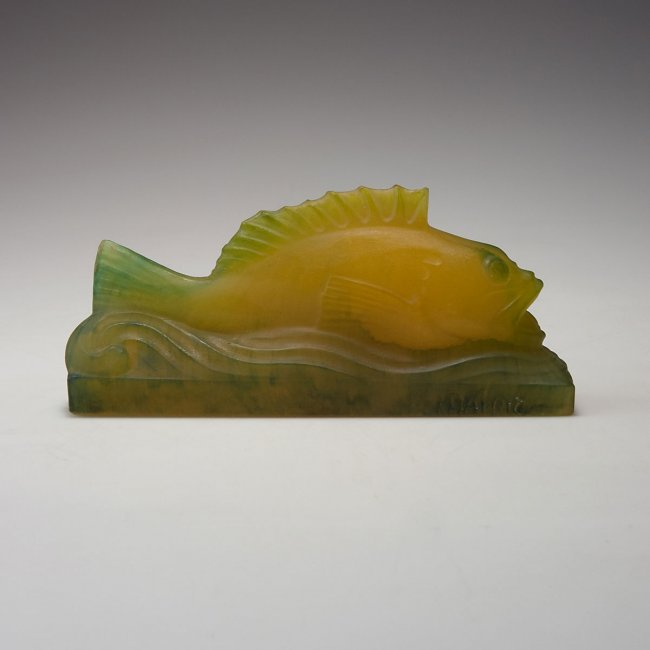
Poisson art deco, c. 1930

Victor Amalric Walter (19 May 1870 – 9 November 1959) was a French glass maker mainly known for his pâte de verre (a glass casting method that translates as glass paste) pieces.

== Biography ==
Born in Sèvres on 19 May 1870, Walter first worked at the Manufacture nationale de Sèvres, near Paris, where he decorated and glazed earthenware pieces. He won a bronze award at the National and Colonial Fair of Rouen in 1896 and a gold award at the International Work Faire of Paris in 1901. He was impressed by the pâtes de verre of Albert Damousse and Henri Cros who received the Gold Medal of the 1900 World's Fair.

He then decided to work for the Cristalleries Daum at Nancy, France, from 1904 or 1905, where he stayed until the first World War in 1915. There, he met a designer/modelist, Henri Bergé, with whom he made pâtes de verre always signed "Daum Nancy", without his name nor Bergé's name. With his help, he cast around 100 different models; but few of these pieces from this period were preserved. He help decorating the living room of the Maison Losseau in 1911 with 15 pâte de verres representing the Belfry of Thuin and the river Sambre.

After the war, he decided to create his own glass studio at Nancy, rue Claudot. He continued his collaboration with Henri Bergé. From 1919 to 1935 with Bergé and other famous sculptors or designers, he cast not less than 500 models, always in few numbers due to the sophisticated technique of glass kiln casting. It is said that when he was not happy about pieces that came out from the kiln, he used to throw them onto the outside wall of his studio, saying he was a genuine perfectionist. His staff was not numerous (8-10 workers maximum).

Art Deco began to replace Art Nouveau, and arts and crafts production or small business sector became non-competitive due to high manufacturing costs. He then reoriented his production and cast simpler pieces, influenced by Art Deco design. Most of his pieces of the later period involve at most three colours, to reduce costs.

After 1935, Walter's workshop closed. He also progressively became blind. He died on 9 November 1959, blind and destitute, at Lury-sur-Arnon where he was visiting a friend.

== Legacy ==
Walter's work and glass casting process was neglected after his death. The Amalric Walter Research Project was launched in 2006 by Keith Cummings and Max Stewart in Dudley, England. At the same time an exhibition on Walter's pâtes de verre was held at the Broadfield House Glass Museum.
