= Veronica Smirnoff =

British artist of Russian origin (born 1979)

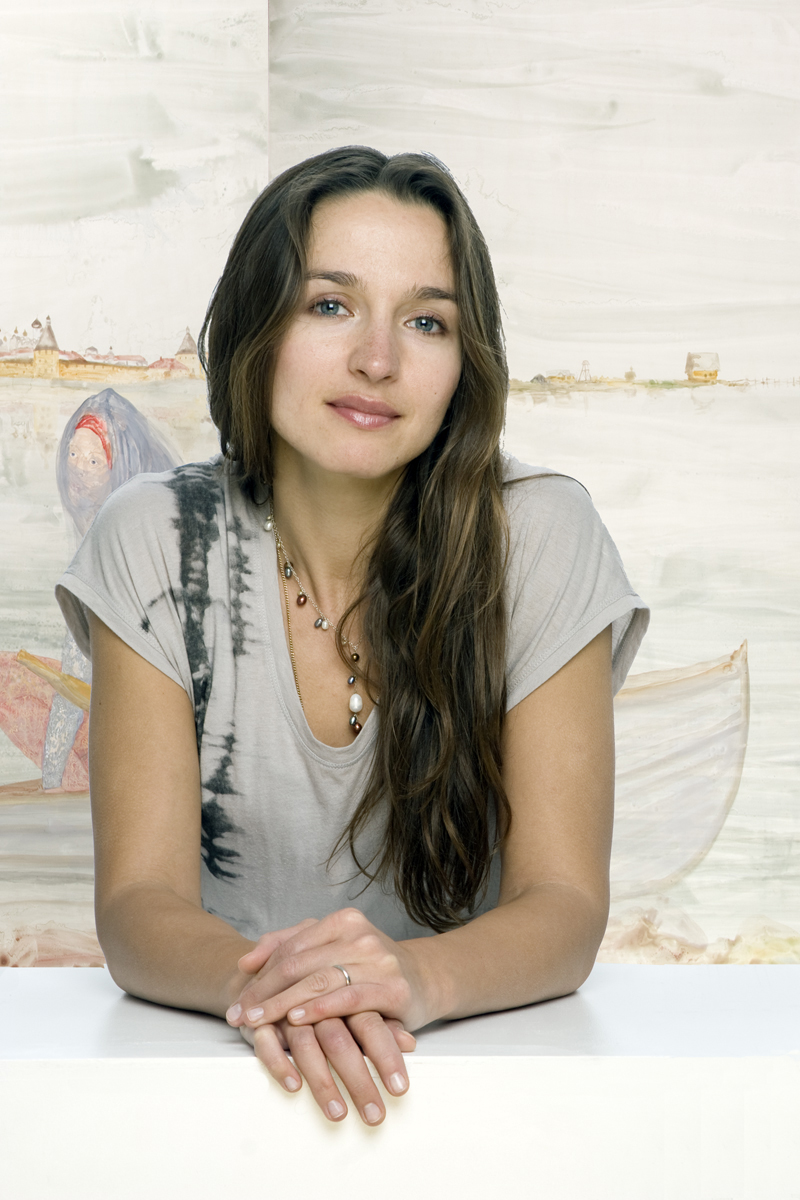
- Veronica Smirnoff
- Born: 1979 (age 46–47); Moscow, Russia
- Education: Slade School of Fine Art, Royal Academy of Art
- Website: veronicasmirnoff.com

Veronica Smirnoff (1979) is a British artist of Russian origin. She is known for her paintings in egg tempera, made by mixing pigments from ground semi-precious stones with egg yolk. She was selected for the John Moores Painting Prize UK in 2010. Born in Moscow, she is now based in London, having left Russia in the mid-90s.

== Early life ==
Smirnoff was born in Moscow, Russia in 1979. She moved to Edinburgh in 1994 to attend St. George's School for Girls, before moving to London in 1998.

== Career ==
Smirnoff gained a BA from the Slade School of Fine Art and a Post-Graduate Diploma from the Royal Academy of Arts. She was awarded the Terence Cuneo Prize in 2004. Her first solo exhibition was in 2008 with Galleria Riccardo Crespi, Milan, who she is represented by. In 2008, she was also included in 'Invasion/Evasion', an exhibition hosted by Baibakov Art Projects in Moscow, which included work by Gosha Ostretsov and Kirill Chelushkin, among others. Smirnoff had her second solo exhibition with Galleria Riccardo Crespi in 2013. In 2013, Smirnoff was included in 'Everywhere But Now', 4th Thessaloniki Biennale, Greek Museum of Contemporary Art, Thessaloniki. In the same year, she was selected for 'The Future Can Wait', a multi-disciplinary show consisting of artists who work in painting, drawing, video, sculpture, performance and installation, curated by Zavier Ellis and Simon Rumley. Her work was part of the collection of Sting and Trudie Styler, who commissioned a series of panels especially for the staircase of their home. These works were later included in the exhibition and auction 'Sting & Trudie Styler: The Composition of a Collection' at Christie's, London ahead of the couple's move to Battersea Power Station in 2016. In 2017, Smirnoff had a solo exhibition with Jessica Carlisle, London.
