= Russian Riviera =

Russian Riviera (La Riviera russe/ Русская Ривьера) is a Russian high-end lifestyle magazine launched in 2011 in France by Anton Koslov Mayr, Guela Patiachvili and Natalia Garilskaya. The publication enjoyed reputation as an intellectual magazine for the Russia’s rich. It was praised for its quality by many media commentators, including Russian social columnist and opposition figure Bozhena Rynska. In 2015 the publication was acquired by a US-based media agency GPMM.

Russian Riviera was originally created as a tourist publication, providing practical information for Russian-speaking visitors in France and Monaco. However, in its second issue it began publishing interviews with opposition figures, short stories, and articles that otherwise couldn’t be published in Russia.

"Russian Riviera" often featured interviews with high-profile political figures including anti-Putin activist and billionaire Bill Browder, Soviet defector and author Viktor Suvorov, Putin's spiritual mentor Bishop Tikhon Shevkunov, politician Irina Khakamada, dissident artists Eric Bulatov and Mikhail Roginsky. The magazine had a literary section and regularly published short stories by authors including Zakhar Prilepin, Lev Timofeev, George Kopelian, and Lera Tikhonova. The magazine was also reputed for its photography and illustrations: it featured the works of Gueorgui Pinkhassov, Stanley Green, Urs Bigler, Peter Lindbergh, Irina Polin, Stephen Shanabrook, Anton Koslov Mayr and others.

== Natalia Garilskaya Incident ==
In May 2014, Russian Riviera correspondent Natalia Garilskaya, known for her pro-Ukrainian position, was arrested in Moscow during an anti-Putin rally. She was later expelled from the country.
