= Artout project =

International artist collective

Artout Project, a.k.a. Artout Escort Agency - an experimental art project created in 2006 by Anton Koslov Mayr with an international group of artists, including theater critic and director of Black Box Theater in Oslo Jon Refsdal Moe, artists Per Platou, Kate Pendry, Ira Waldron, Georgy Ostretsov, Mike Rimbaud, Alexander Kosolapov, Eric Poujeau, Dana Wise, Elena Kovylina, Sena Yoon, Leban and Kleindienst, opera singer Evgeny Nikitin, and others. The project is a part of the Institutional Critique movement, but also relies on relational art practices. The ideas behind the project were formulated by Anton Koslov Mayr in his essay "On Art and Domination", Jon Refsdal Moe's "Staging Cultural Prosperity" and Sueli Rolni's "The Geopolitics of Pimping".

Artout Project was set up as a service company offering as a product artists' time, rather than any material work. Any interested party can hire an artist to spend time with and this in itself constitutes a creative act. The project was conceived as a meditation on the relationship between art collectors and art producers, exploring new territories of intersubjectivity and institutional control.

== 2009 Bridge Art Fair ==
In 2009 the Artout Project was invited as a special feature of Bridge Art Fair in New York. New York Post art critic Dan Avery hailed Artout as "the most inventive in adapting to new economic realities".
