= Anton Koslov Mayr =

American Photographer, Author and Film-maker

Anton Mayr is an American photographer, author and film-maker. Anton Mayr is known for his poetry, art criticism and photography Between 1998 and 2008 Koslov-May taught at Parsons School of Design in Paris. In 2000, under the fictitious name of Lee Mayr, Koslov Mayr became one of the winners of prestigious art competition "Search for Art" organized by the Italian fashion company Mandarina Duck. In 2006, Koslov Mayr created the Artout project, which was viewed as an important part of the Institutional Critique movement. Koslov-Mayr worked on film projects with American artists Richard Dailey and Hilton McConnico (Hope, 1999), and film-makers Laurent Boutonnat and Mark Boswell. Mayr and Boswell collaborated on a number of projects, the most notorious being "The United Nations is Decadent and Depraved", shown in New York and in Moscow in 2009. The project was based on Hunter S. Thomson short story "The Kentucky Derby is Decadent and Depraved." In 2010 it was nominated for the Kandinsky Prize.
