= Lev Timofeev =

Russian economist and author

Lev Mikhailovich Timofeev
- Лев Миха́йлович Тимофе́ев
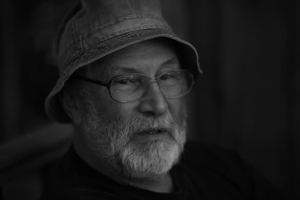
- Born: 8 September 1936 (age 89); Leningrad, Soviet Union
- Citizenship: Russia
- Education: MGIMO
- Occupations: Russian economist, writer, civil rights activist
- Known for: his participation in Soviet dissident movement
- Movement: the dissident movement in the Soviet Union

Lev Timofeev (Russian: Лев Миха́йлович Тимофе́ев; born 8 September 1936) is a Russian economist, political commentator and novelist. The son of a high-ranking government official, Timofeev graduated from the Moscow State Institute of International Relations.

== Career ==
In the late 1960s and 70s, Timofeev worked as a journalist for Moscow magazines such as Novy Mir and Kommunist. Timofeev's 1985 book The Technology of the Black Market or the Peasant Art of Starving was published in the West by Telos Press. The book presented a harsh condemnation of the Communist economic system.

Timofeev was arrested and sentenced to 11 years of hard labour and internal exile on the grounds of "anti-Soviet propaganda". He was freed in 1987 by a special decree signed by Mikhail Gorbachev. In the late 1980s, Timofeev published Referendum magazine and served as chairman of the Moscow Helsinki Committee for Human Rights, a human rights watchdog. Timofeev became one of the most vocal proponents of economic liberalization in Russia.

In 1993 Timofeev ran for parliament on the Democratic Russia ticket. He was appointed professor at the Russian State University for the Humanities, Timofeev was for many years director of the Center for Research on Extralegal Economic Systems and advised the government of Boris Yeltsin. In the mid-1990s he joined the Transnational Radical Party and became a member of its General Council. Timofeev is one of the leading theorists of drug decriminalization.

In early 2000 Timofeev retired from politics and teaching and embarked on a career of a novelist: since 2004 he published three novels and a collection of short stories. His 2006 novel Negative was nominated for the Booker Prize. Between 2011 and 2015 Timofeev regularly published his short stories in the Russian Riviera magazine.

== Family ==
Lev Timofeev has three children: Sofiya, Yekaterina and Anton.
