= Hilton McConnico =

American designer and artist (1943–2018)

Joseph Hilton McConnico (13 May 1943 – 29 January 2018) was a designer and artist who was born in Memphis, Tennessee, and lived and worked in Paris, France, from 1965.

== Biography ==
A self-taught fashion designer, Hilton McConnico officially launched his first atelier when he was 16 years old and, after winning a challenge organized by Vogue magazine, discovered Paris, where he moved two years later.

After working in fashion for such designers as Ted Lapidus and Yves St. Laurent, McConnico was set designer and art director for more than 20 films, including the cult classic Diva. In 1990, Memphis Brooks Museum of Art held a retrospective of 30 years of his creations.

His collaboration with Daum crystal began in 1987; some of his "Cactus" creations for the manufacturer were presented by former French President François Mitterrand to President George H. W. Bush as a gift of state. He was also the first American to have work permanently inducted into the Louvre's Decorative Arts collection.

McConnico remained active on the global design scene, especially in architecture and interior design. Later projects included the Toupary restaurant on the fifth-floor of the historic Samaritaine department store and the Hermes Museum in Tokyo, which he conceived for the new Renzo Piano building in the famed Ginza shopping district and a collection of limited series and unique pieces for Formia International in Murano Glass.

Hilton McConnico was affected by the Parkinson's disease before his death.

== Awards ==
- 2005: Talent de l'Audace prize from the Sommet du Luxe et de la Création
