= Clifford Rainey =

Sculptor

Clifford Rainey is a British artist born 1948, Whitehead, County Antrim, Northern Ireland. Principally a sculptor who employs cast glass and drawing as his primary methodologies, his work is interdisciplinary, incorporating a wide spectrum of materials and processes. He began his career as a linen damask designer and worked in William Ewarts linen manufacturers from 1965 to 1968. Later, the artist studied at Hornsey College of Art, and the Walthamstow School of Art, where he specialized in bronze casting, and the Royal College of Art where he received an MA specializing in cast glass. Between 1973 and 1990, Rainey ran his own studios in London and between 1984 and 1990 an additional studio in New York. Rainey has always balanced his commitment to studio practice with his desire to share knowledge. He has lectured extensively around the world and was a lecturer at the Royal College of Art from 1978 until 1984. In 1975 he won a commission for a small sculpture to commemorate the Silver Jubilee of Elizabeth II and in 1976 was commissioned by Sun Life Assurance to make a large glass sculpture in Bristol. Rainey was the Chair of the Glass Program at the California College of the Arts in Oakland, California, from 1991 until 2017. He retired from CCA in 2023, Professor Emeritus, but continues to work from his studio in Napa, California where he also resides. He is an active member of the Chelsea Arts Club in London.

== Public art ==
He has realized a number of large-scale public art commissions, including at Liverpool Lime Street railway station, England, The Jeddah Monument, Saudi Arabia, and The 911 Communication Center, San Francisco.

== Exhibitions ==
Rainey's work has exhibited internationally including: the Ulster Museum in Northern Ireland, the Victoria and Albert Museum, London, the Kunstmuseum Düsseldorf in Dusseldorf, Germany, the Millennium Museum (also known as the China World Art Museum), and the Museo de Arte Contemporáneo in Monterrey, Mexico. His work is in the permanent collections of numerous museums including: the Irish Museum of Modern Art, Dublin, Ireland, the De Young Museum, San Francisco, California, the Los Angeles County Museum of Art, Los Angeles, California, the Museum of Arts and Design, New York, the Museum of Fine Arts, Boston, and the Montreal Museum of Fine Arts, Canada.

== Awards ==
Rainey is a recipient of an Honorary Coburg Glass Prize, 1977, the 2000 Virginia A. Groot Foundation Award and the 2009 Urban Glass Outstanding Achievement Award, New York.

== Works ==
- Head (1986), Pencil and pastel on paper, Arts Council of Northern Ireland collection
- Palm Springs, Copper, brass and glass box on marble plinth, Arts Council of Northern Ireland collection
- Shy Boy (2005), Museum of Fine Arts, Boston
