= Daum (studio) =

Maker of decorative glass in Nancy, France

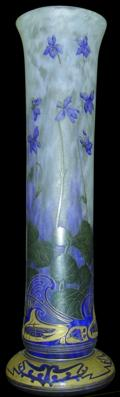
Daum vase, circa 1900

Daum is a crystal studio based in Nancy, France, founded in 1878 by Jean Daum (1825–1885). His sons, Auguste Daum (1853–1909) and Antonin Daum (1864–1931), oversaw its growth during the burgeoning Art Nouveau period. Daum is one of the only crystal manufacturers to employ the pâte de verre (glass paste) process for art glass and crystal sculptures, a technique in which crushed glass is packed into a refractory mould and then fused in a kiln.

== History ==
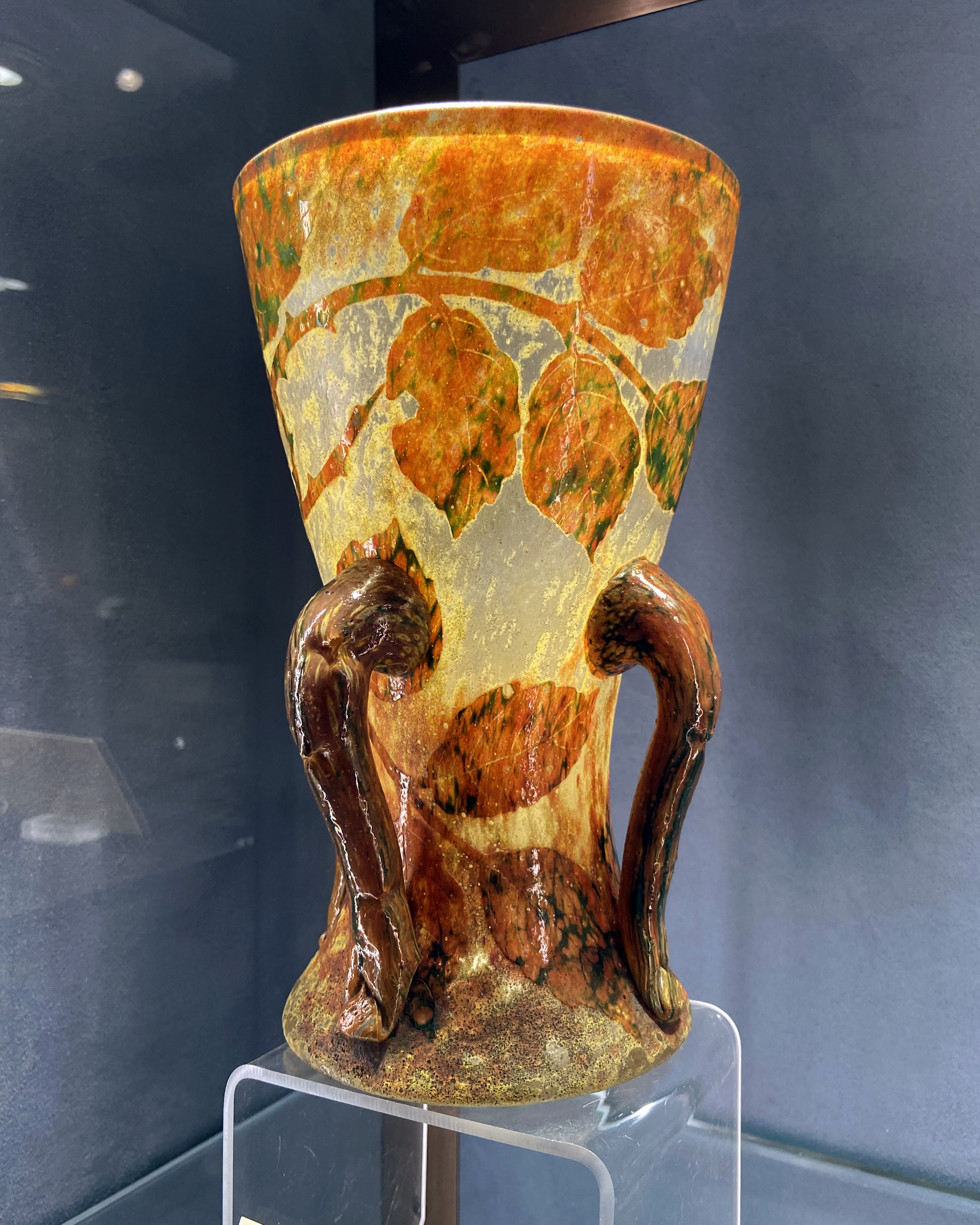
Cameo glass vase by Daum Nancy

The Daum family worked at the beginning of the Art Nouveau era and created one of France's most prominent glassworks. Established at the end of the 19th century, Daum's renown was originally linked to the École de Nancy and the art of pâte-de-cristal, a major contributing factor to its worldwide reputation.

During the Universal Exhibition of 1900 Daum was awarded a 'Grand Prix' medal. Daum glass became more elaborate. Acid etching (by Jacques Grüber) was often combined with carving, enamelling, and engraving on a single piece of glass to produce creative glass masterpieces. The most complicated creations also featured applied glass elements, such as handles and ornamental motifs in naturalistic forms. The Daum brothers soon became a major force in the Art Nouveau movement, seriously rivalling Gallé, so much so that when Émile Gallé died in 1904 they became the leaders in the field of decorative glass.

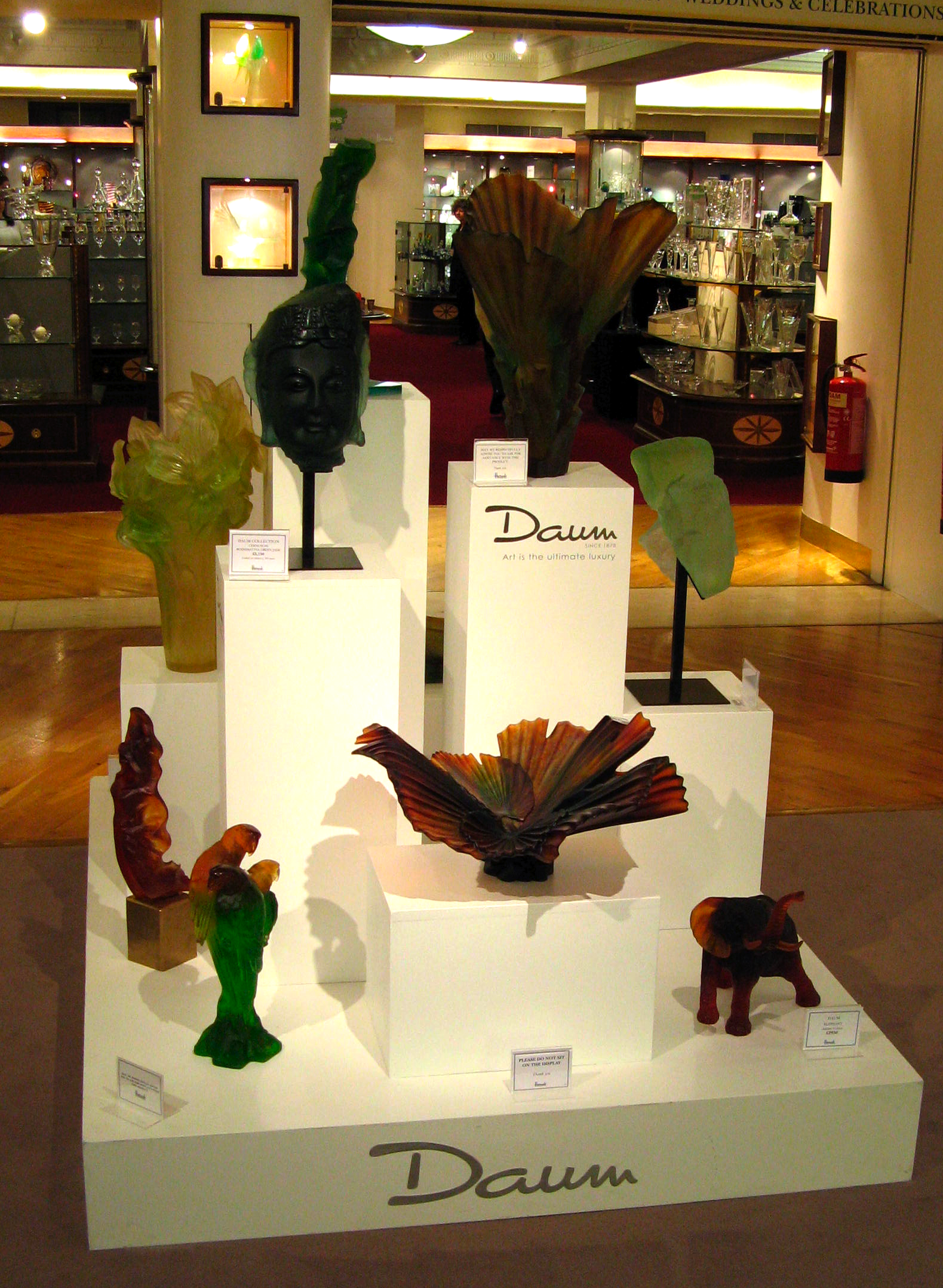
Daum display in Harrods London department store in 2007

In 1906 Daum revived pâte de verre (glass paste), an ancient Egyptian method of glass casting, developing the method so that by the 1930s Daum's window panels used pâte de verre for richness instead of leaded or painted glass. Today Daum still uses this method to produce its pieces.

== Locations ==
Daum has always been linked with the city of Nancy. Its main manufacturing locations are in the downtown of Nancy and a nearby village called Vannes-le-Châtel. All the pieces are still handmade by hundreds of employees in the region.

Daum has a store at Place Stanislas in Nancy and Park Avenue in New York City.

== Museum collection ==
More than 600 glasswork items are in the Daum Collection at the Museum of Fine Arts of Nancy (Nancy Musée des Beaux-Arts), which documents the history of glass manufacturing.

From May to October 2010, another exhibition in Carmaux brought together pieces based on works by Georges Braque and Salvador Dalí. From September 2015 to January 2016, an exhibition retracing the partnership between Salvador Dalí and the Maison Daum was held at the Espace Dali de Montmartre in Paris (Salvador Dalí). This exhibition featured Dali's products created for DAUM but also those of other collaborations such as Richard Texier, Arman, César, Jérôme Mesnager, Carlos Mata, Ben.

== Notable artists ==
Since the peak of the Art Nouveau era, DAUM has worked with hundreds of artists and designers to create new collections. Among them were:

- Arman
- Hilton McConnico
- Philippe Starck
- Salvador Dalí
- Cyril Phan, a.k.a. Kongo
- Richard Texier
- Emilio Robba
- Philippe Druillet
- Henri Bergé
