= Georgy Ostretsov =

Russian artist

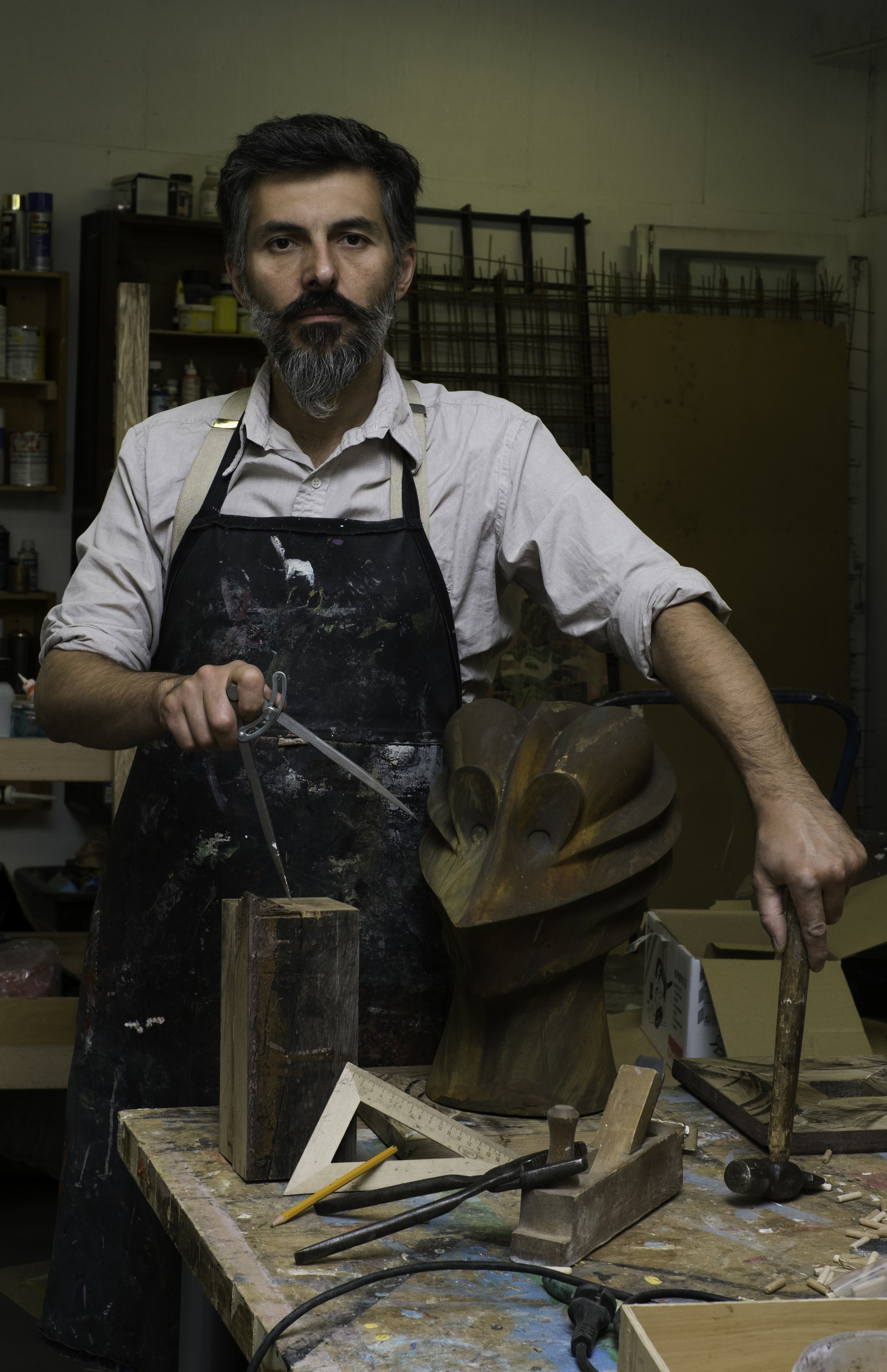
Gosha Ostretsov

Georgy (Gosha) Ostretsov is a Russian artist and performer. Ostretsov represented Russia during the 53rd Venice Biennale in 2009.

== Biography ==
Born in Moscow in 1967, Ostretsov went to Paris, France, in 1988, where he worked in fashion industry and advertising. and married Liudmila Konstantinova, a Moscow artist, in 2007, with whom they have four children. In 2010, he created an association of contemporary artists called VGLAZ, working with Artika project Company to design public studios to help artists.

== Selected solo exhibitions ==
- 2016 I’ve Been Abducted Hundred Times. Triangle Gallery. Moscow
- 2009 Personal project during the 53rd Venice Biennale.

== Selected group exhibitions ==
- 2015 Pink box, Erarta Museum. St-Petersbourg
- 2014 Contemporary paint. State Russian Museum. St-Petersbourg
- 2014 Reconstruction-2. Cultural found "Ekaterina". Moscow
- 2012 Gaiety Is The Most Outstanding Feature of the Soviet Union, Saatchi Gallery. London
- 2010 Russian landscape. Marat Gelman gallery. Moscow.
- 2009 VROOM! La Maison Rouge. Paris.
- 2008 Sots Art / Political Art in Russia from 1972 to today. La Maison Rouge. Paris.
- 2007 2nd Moscow Biennial Exhibition of Modern Art, "Sots-Art", Tretyakov Gallery, Moscow.
- 2005 Participation in a group exhibition within the 1st Moscow Biennial Exhibition of Modern Art, "Soobshchniki" (Partners), Tretyakov Gallery, Moscow.
- 2005 "George&George" exhibition "In process", paintings, video. State Center of Modern Art, Moscow.
