= Glass casting =

Process for making objects from molten glass

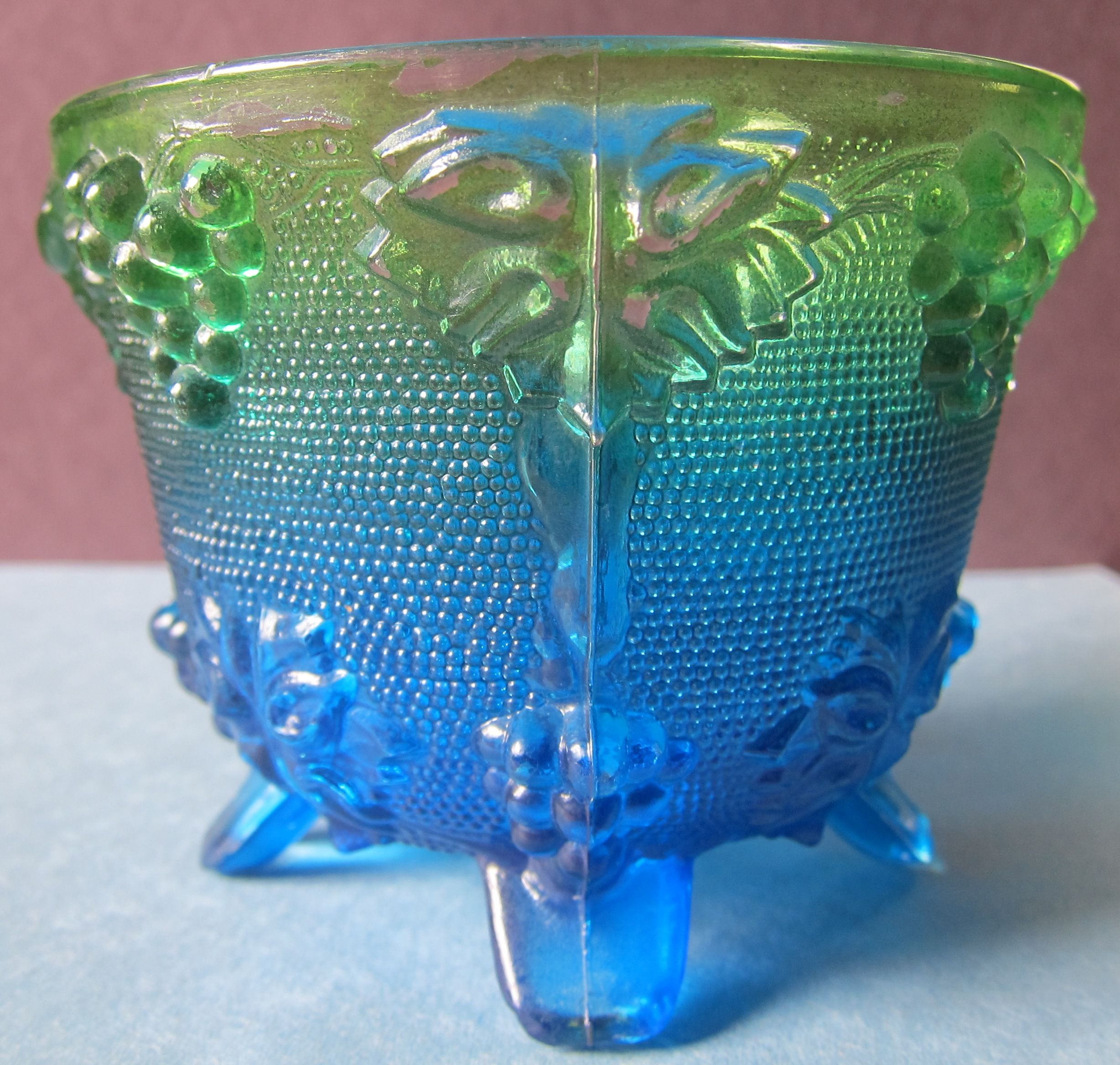
A bowl made from cast-glass. The two halves are joined by the weld seam, running down the middle.

Glass casting is the process in which glass objects are cast by directing molten glass into a mould where it solidifies. The technique has been used since the 15th century BCE in both Ancient Egypt and Mesopotamia. Modern cast glass is formed by a variety of processes such as kiln casting or casting into sand, graphite or metal moulds.

== History ==
=== Roman period ===
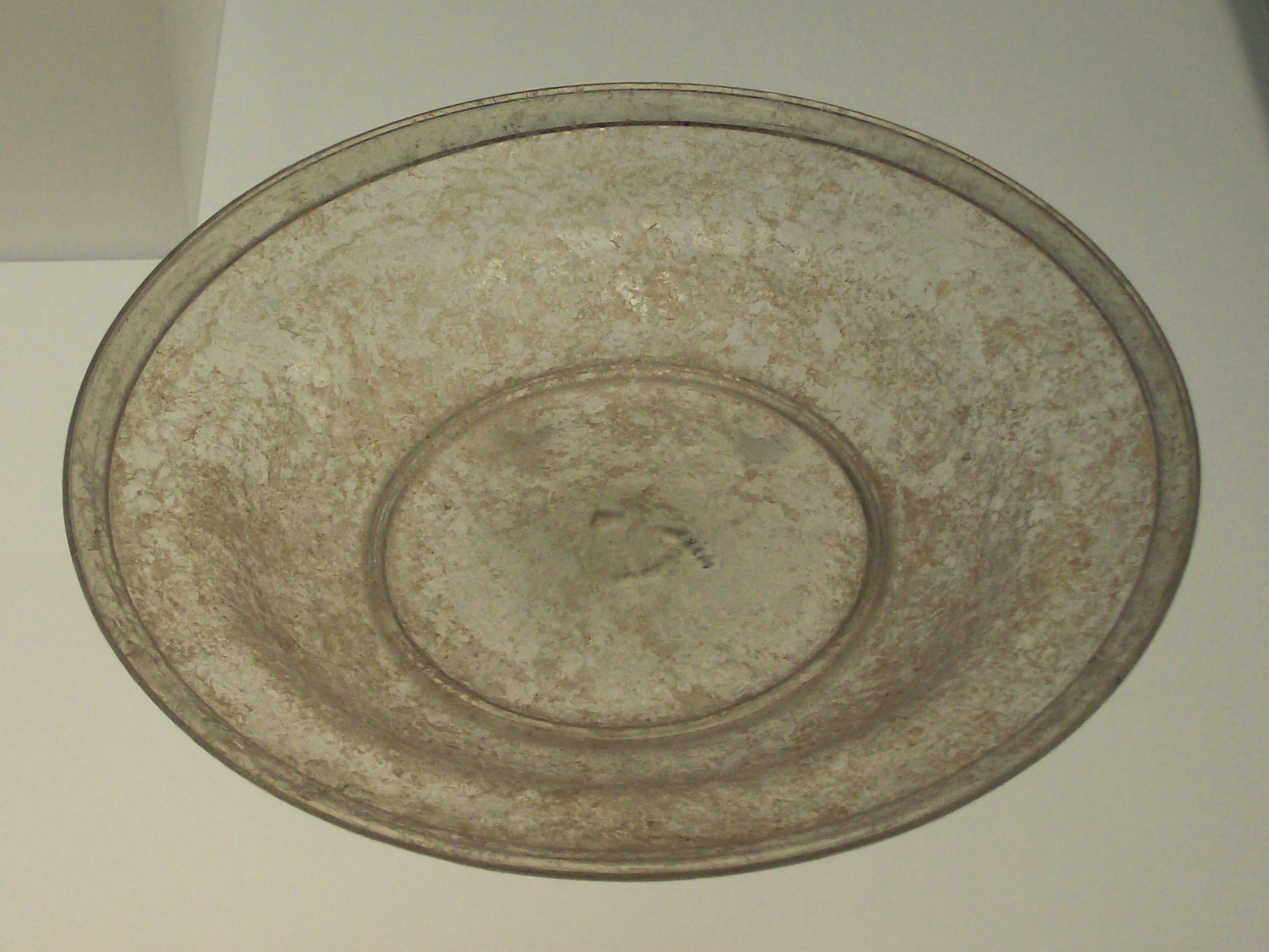
Roman cast-glass plate from the 3rd century, found in Cyprus

During the Roman period, moulds consisting of two or more interlocking parts were used to create blank glass dishes. Glass could be added to the mould either by frit casting, where the mould was filled with chips of glass (called frit) and then heated to melt the glass, or by pouring molten glass into the mould. Evidence from Pompeii suggests that molten hot glass may have been introduced as early as the mid-1st century CE. Blank vessels were then annealed, fixed to lathes and cut and polished on all surfaces to achieve their final shape. Pliny the Elder indicates in his Natural History (36.193) that lathes were used in the production of most glass of the mid-1st century.

Italy is believed to have been the source of the majority of early Imperial polychrome cast glass, whereas monochrome cast glasses are more predominant elsewhere in the Mediterranean. Forms produced show clear inspiration from the Roman bronze and silver industries, and in the case of carinated bowls and dishes, from the ceramic industry. Cast vessel forms became more limited during the late 1st century, but continued in production into the second or third decade of the 2nd century. Colourless cast bowls were widespread throughout the Roman world in the late 1st and early 2nd century CE, and may have been produced at more than one centre. Some revival of the casting technique appears in the 3rd or 4th century, but appears to have produced relatively small numbers of vessels

== Modern techniques ==
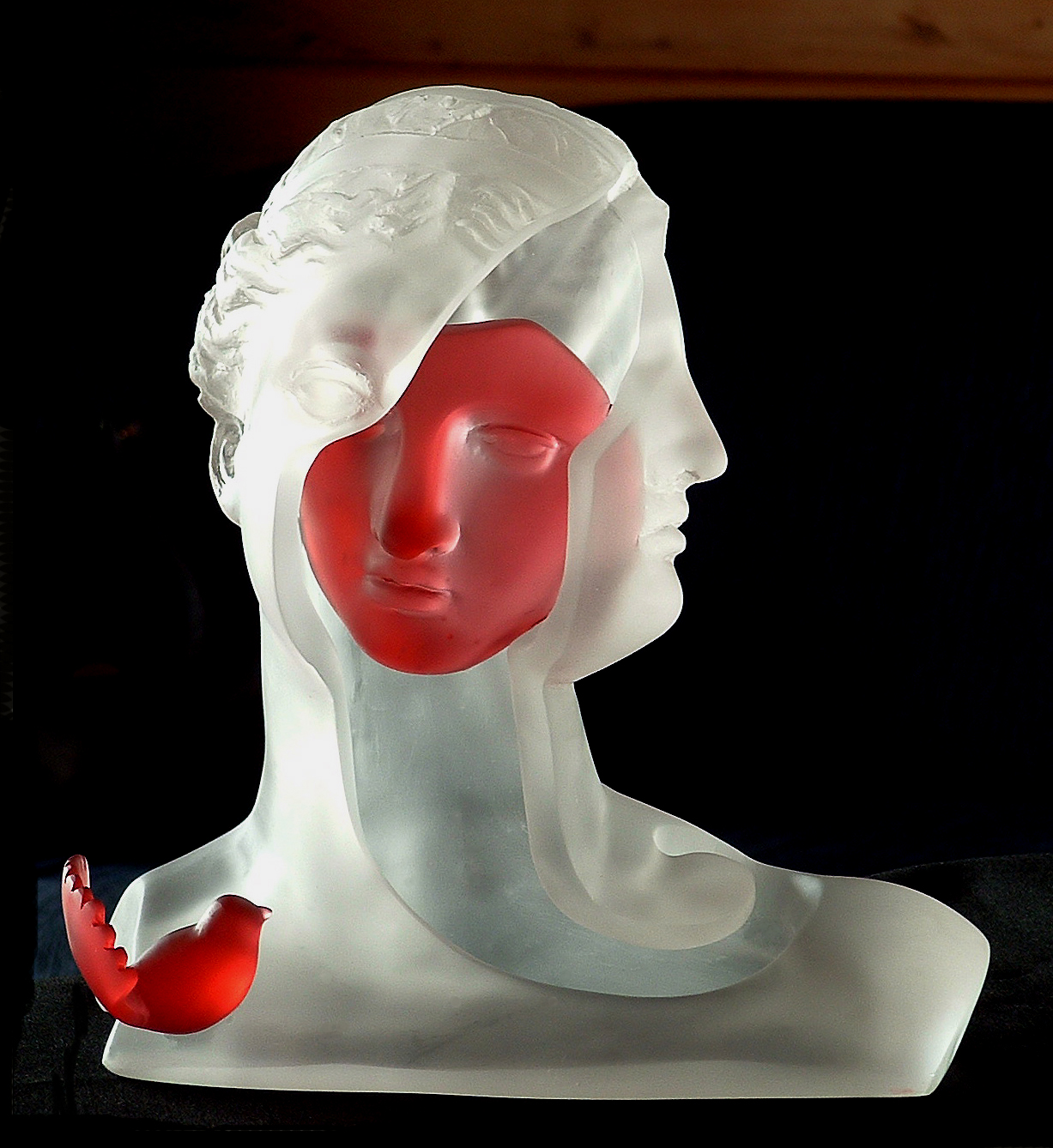
A cast glass sculpture from a kiln firing

=== Sand casting ===
Sand casting involves the use of hot molten glass poured directly into a preformed mould. It is a process similar to casting metal into a mould. The sand mould is typically prepared by using a mixture of clean sand and a small proportion of the water-absorbing clay bentonite. Bentonite acts as a binding material. In the process, a small amount of water is added to the sand-bentonite mixture, and this is well mixed and sifted before addition to an open topped container. A template is prepared (typically made of wood, or a found object or even a body part such as a hand or fist) which is tightly pressed into the sand to make a clean impression. This impression then forms the mould.

The surface of the mould can be covered in coloured glass powders or frits to give a surface colour to the sand cast glass object. When the mould preparation is complete hot glass is ladled from the furnace at temperatures of about 1,200 °C (2,190 °F) to allow it to freely pour. The hot glass is poured directly into the mould. During the pouring process, glass or compatible objects may be placed to later give the appearance of floating in the solid glass object. This very immediate and dynamic method was pioneered and perfected in the 1980s by the Swedish artist Bertil Vallien.

=== Kiln casting ===
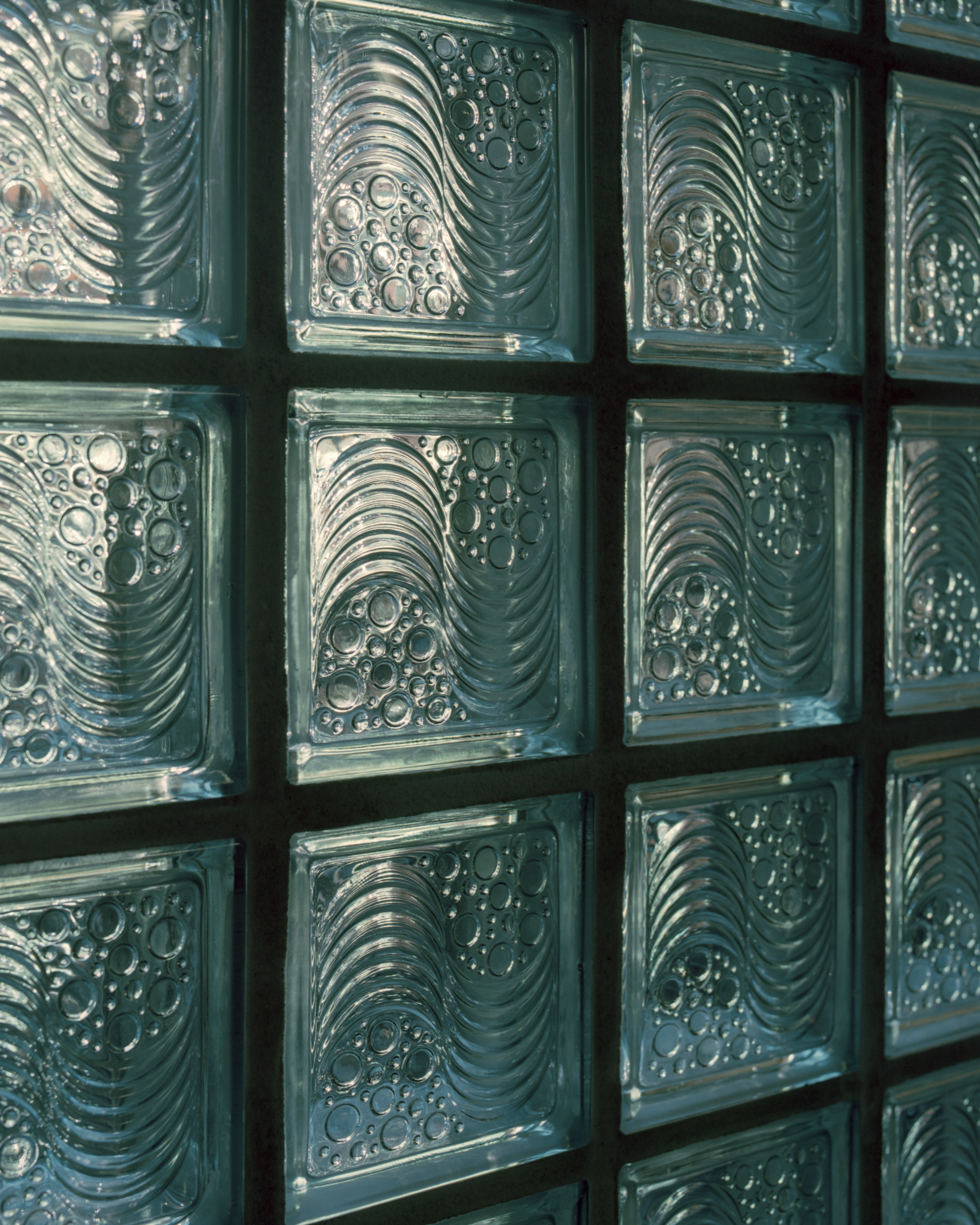
Decorative patterned kiln casting glass for window.

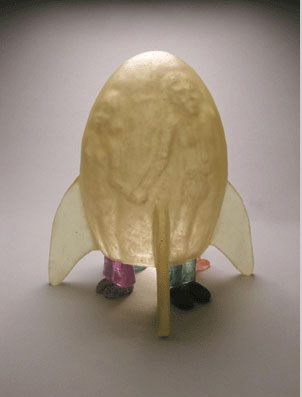
Kiln-Cast lead crystal

Kiln casting involves the preparation of a mould which is often made of a mixture of plaster and refractory materials such as silica. A model can be made from any solid material, such as wax, wood, or metal, and after taking a cast of the model (a process called investment) the model is removed from the mould. One method of forming a mould is by the Cire perdue or "lost wax" method. Using this method, a model can be made from wax and after investment the wax can be steamed or burned away in a kiln, forming a cavity. The mould is equipped with a funnel-like reservoir filled with solid glass granules or lumps. The heat resistant mould is then placed in a kiln and heated to between 800 °C (1,470 °F) and 1,000 °C (1,830 °F) to melt the glass. As the glass melts it runs into and fills the mould.

Such kiln cast work can be of very large dimensions, as in the work of Czech artists Stanislav Libenský and Jaroslava Brychtová. Kiln cast glass has become an important material for contemporary artists such as Clifford Rainey, Karen LaMonte and Tomasz Urbanowicz, author of the "United Earth" glass sculpture in the European Parliament in Strasbourg.

==== Pâte de verre ====
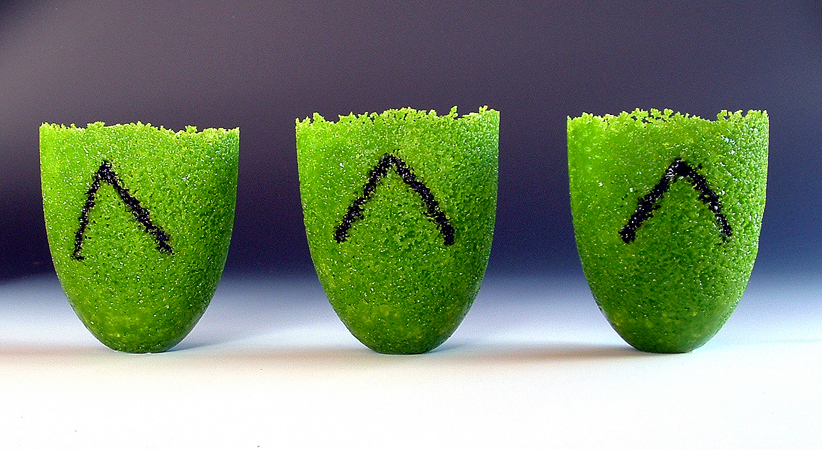
Three pate de verre vessels.

Pâte de verre is a form of kiln casting and literally translated means glass paste. In this process, finely crushed glass is mixed with a binding material, such as a mixture of gum arabic and water, and often with colourants and enamels. The resultant paste is applied to the inner surface of a negative mould forming a coating. When the coated mould is fired at the appropriate temperature the glass is fused creating a hollow object that can have thick or thin walls depending on the thickness of the pate de verre layers. Daum, a French commercial crystal manufacturer, produce highly sculptural pieces in pate de verre.

==== Graphite casting ====
Graphite is also used in the hot forming of glass. Graphite moulds are prepared by carving into them, machining them into curved forms, or stacking them into shapes. Molten glass is poured into a mould where it is cooled until hard enough to be removed and placed into an annealing kiln to cool slowly.

== See also ==
- Amalric Walter – French glass artist specializing in pâte de verre (1870-1959)
- Glass art – Art, substantially or wholly made of glass
