= Baptism of Christ (Ribera) =

1643 painting by Jusepe de Ribera

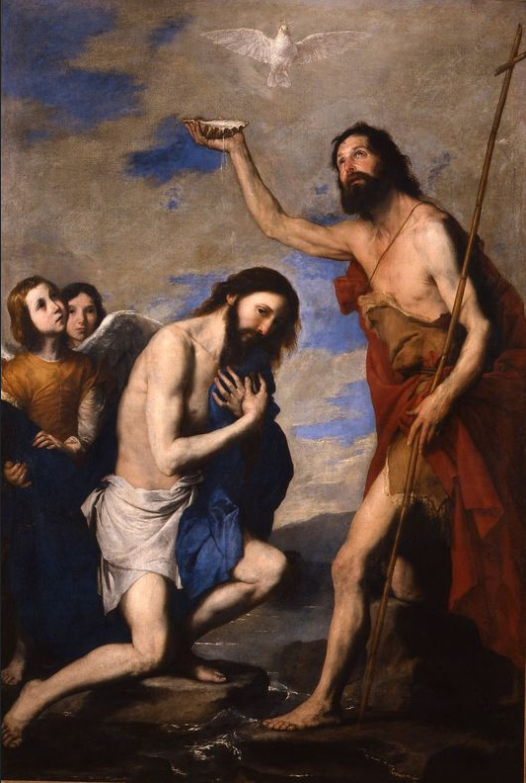
Baptism of Christ (1643) by Jusepe de Ribera

Baptism of Christ is a 1643 painting by Jusepe de Ribera. Since 1881 it has been in the Museum of Fine Arts in Nancy.
