= Hôtel de Ville, Nancy =

Town hall in Nancy, France

Hôtel de Ville
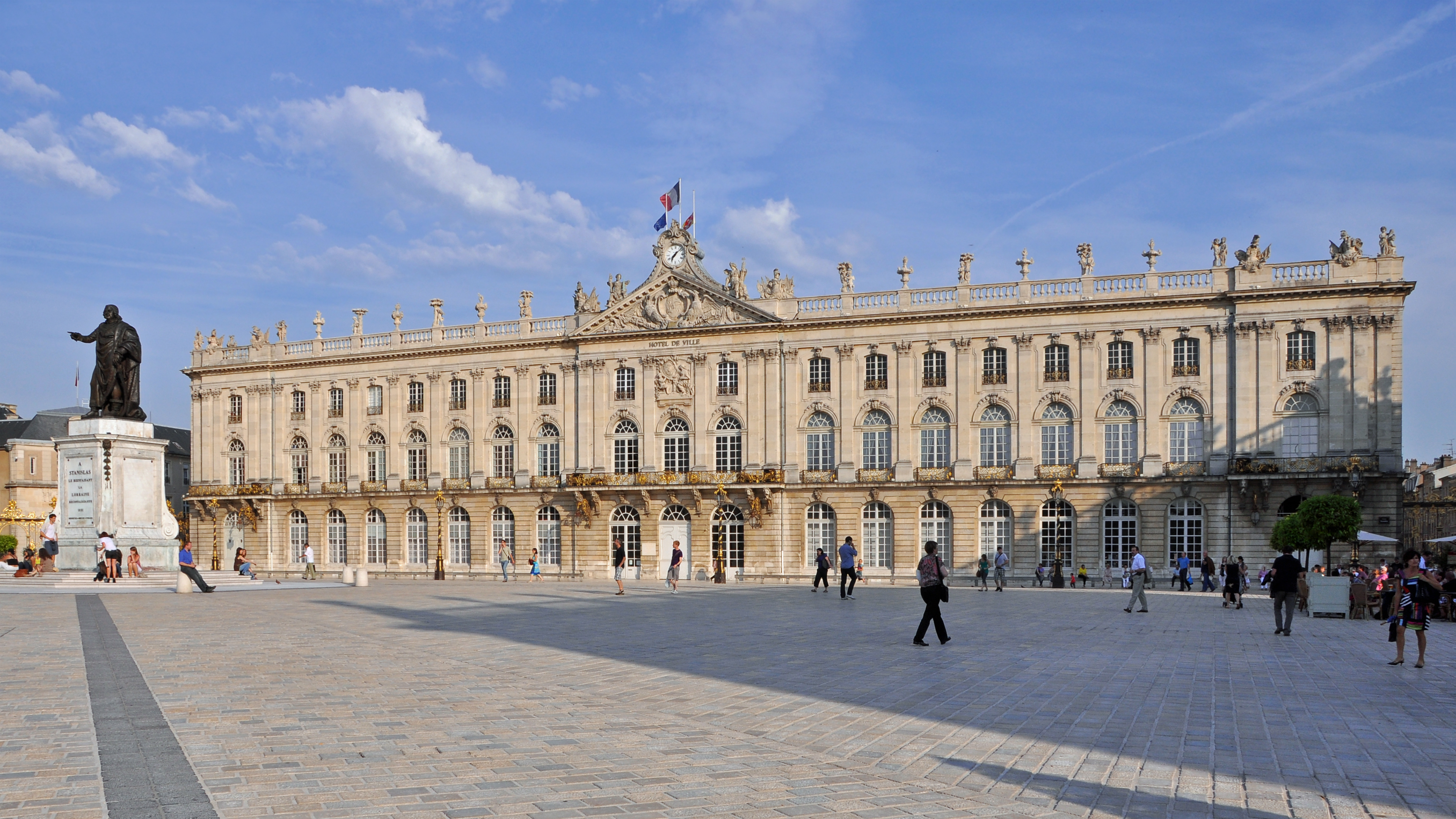
- The main frontage of the Hôtel de Ville in July 2011

General information
- Type: City hall
- Architectural style: Neoclassical style
- Location: Nancy, France
- Coordinates: 48.6929°N 6.1836°E
- Completed: 1755

Design and construction
- Architect: Emmanuel Héré de Corny

Monument historique
- Official name: Hôtel de ville
- Type: Inscrit
- Designated: 1886
- Reference no.: PA00106124

The Hôtel de Ville (French pronunciation: [otɛl də vil], City Hall), also known as the Stanislas Palace, is a historic building in Nancy, Meurthe-et-Moselle, northeastern France, standing on the Place Stanislas. It was designated a monument historique by the French government in 1886.

== History ==
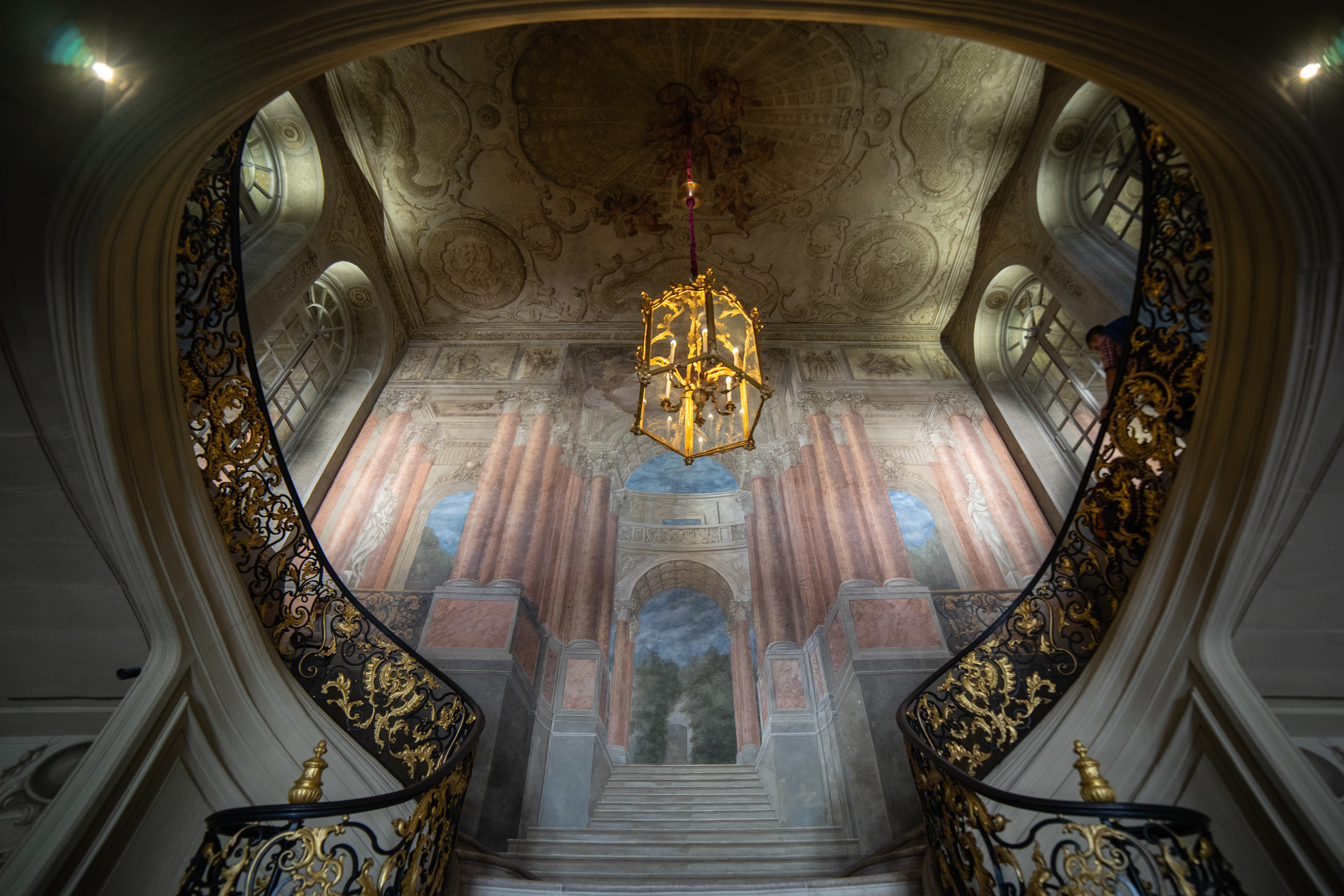
The Grand Staircase

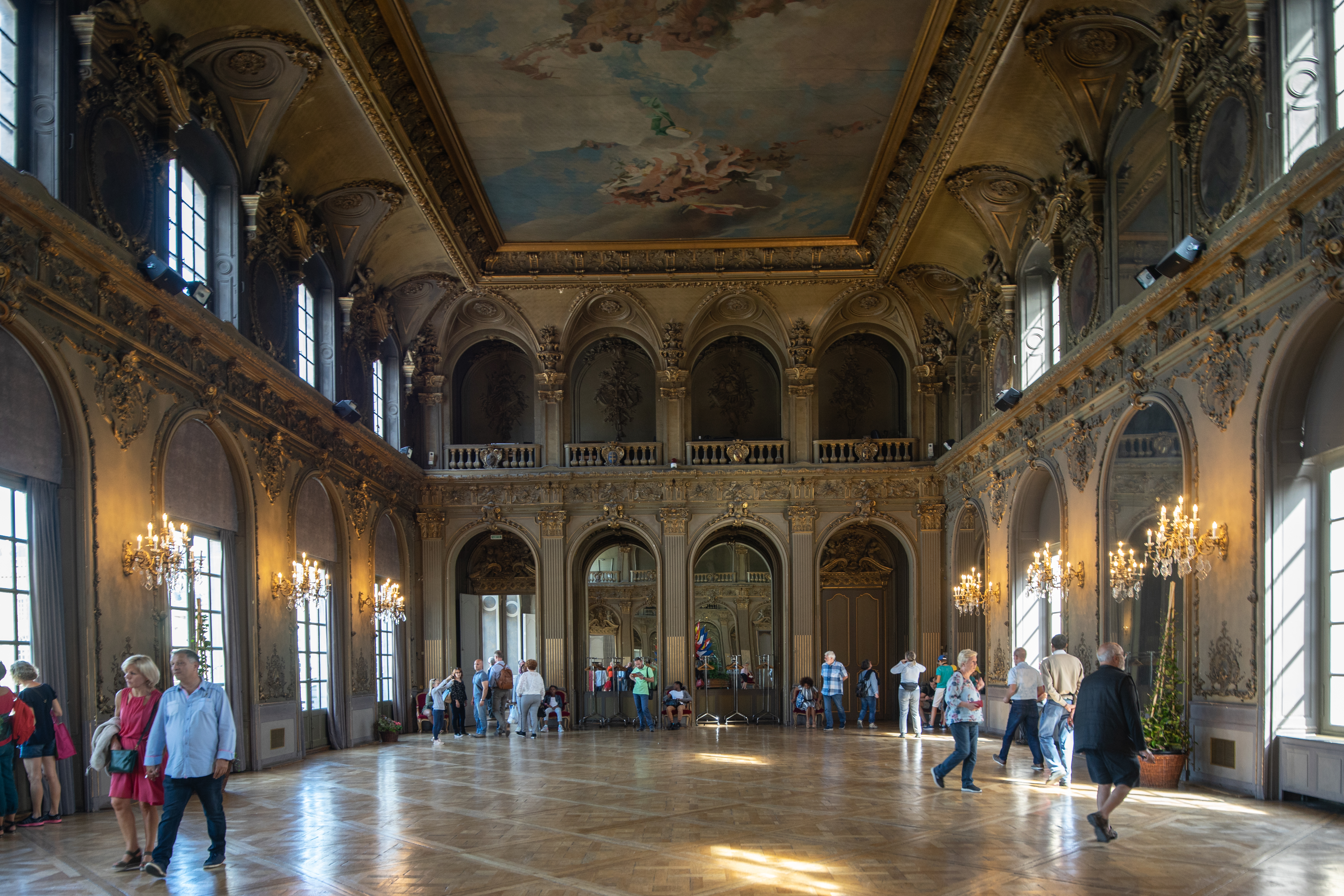
The Grand Salon

Early meetings of the local council were held at No. 1, Rue du Duc Antoine, before the council relocated to a Renaissance style building in Place Mengin (now known as Place Charles III) in the 17th century. In the mid-18th century, Stanisław Leszczyński, who had been created Duke of Lorraine on his abdication as King of Poland, decided to commission a new town hall. The site he selected was occupied by two large properties, the Hôtel de Gerbéviller and the Hôtel de Juvrécourt.

Construction of the new building started in March 1752. It was designed by Emmanuel Héré de Corny in the neoclassical style, built in ashlar stone and was officially opened by Leszczyński on 26 November 1755. The design involved a symmetrical main frontage of 19 bays facing north onto the new square with the end bays slightly projected forward. The ground floor of the main frontage, which was 98 metres (322 ft) long, was rusticated. The central section of three bays, which was also slightly projected forward, featured three round headed doorways on the ground floor, three rounded headed windows with imposts supporting moulded surrounds and keystones on the first floor, and a panel flanked by a pair of segmental headed windows on the second floor. The panel contained a carving of a girl holding a thistle, recalling the Battle of Nancy during which the forces of Charles the Bold besieging the city had been defeated. There were Corinthian order pilasters spanning the first and second floors supporting an entablature and a modillioned pediment with the Stanislas coat of arms in the tympanum. The pediment was surmounted by a clock, which was flanked by sculptures of figures representing justice and prudence. The wings were fenestrated in a similar style and surmounted by an entablature, a modillioned cornice and a balustraded parapet. The wrought iron balconies in front of the windows were the work of Jean Lamour.

Internally, the principal rooms included the entrance vestibule, which was richly decorated, and the grand staircase, which featured wrought iron banisters, also designed by Jean Lamour, and murals on the walls and ceiling, which were painted by Jean Girardet. On the first floor, the main room was the Salon Carré (the Square Room), which originally accommodated the Académie de Stanislas.

Although the principal rooms survived, many of the other rooms in the building were ransacked and badly damaged by revolutionaries in 1792 during the French Revolution. The Grand Salon was created in 1866, to celebrate the centenary of the annexation of Lorraine by France, and was decorated with paintings by Émile Friant, Aimé Morot et Victor Prouvé in the late 19th century. An extension to the rear was completed to a design by Prosper Morey in 1862, and another extension, with 12 full-height round headed glass windows along Rue Pierre Fourier, was completed in 1956.

Following the liberation of the town by American troops on 19 September 1944, during the Second World War, the chairman of the Provisional Government, Charles de Gaulle, visited the building on 13 October 1944.
