= Arc Héré =

Triumphal arch in Nancy, France

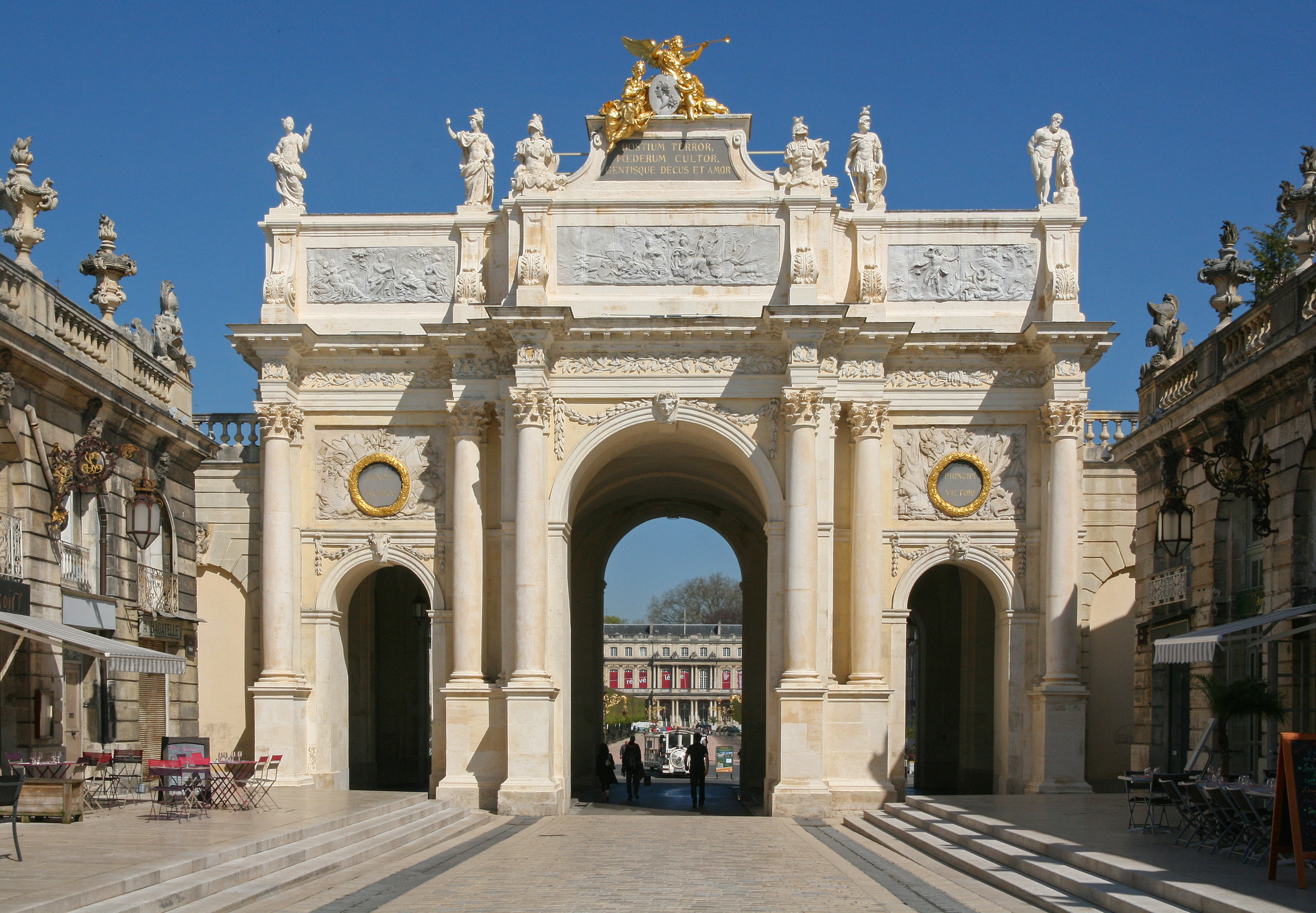
- View of the Arc Héré from the Place Stanislas
- Interactive map of the Arc Héré area

General information
- Type: Triumphal arch
- Architectural style: Neoclassicism
- Location: Place Stanislas
- Coordinates: 48.6944°N 6.1827°E
- Construction started: 1752
- Completed: 1755

Height
- Height: 15 m (49 ft)

Dimensions
- Other dimensions: Width: 60 m (197 ft)

Design and construction
- Architects: Emmanuel Héré de Corny; Barthélemy Guibal

The Arc Héré or Porte Héré is a triumphal arch in Nancy, France, located on the north side of the Place Stanislas. It was designed by Emmanuel Héré de Corny to honor King Louis XV and was built between 1752 and 1755. Its architecture is inspired by the Arch of Septimius Severus in Rome. The Arc replaced an older royal gate constructed under the rule of Louis XIV; three bas reliefs from the old gate are featured on the Arc.

== History ==
The original white marble medallion of Louis XV on top of the Arc was destroyed during the French Revolution. It was quickly replaced with a gilded lead medallion, which was taken down for preservation in 1830 during the July Revolution. It was eventually replaced on the Arc in 1852.

The Arc was designated a monument historique in 1923. It forms part of the architectural ensemble comprising the Place Stanislas, the Place de la Carrière, and the Place d'Alliance, which in 1983 was designated as a UNESCO World Heritage Site.

== Description ==
The Arc displays motifs of war and peace, with one side featuring arrowheads and armor and the other featuring wheat ears and cornucopias. The top of the Arc bears an inscription reading: "HOSTIUM TERROR / FOEDERUM CULTOR / GENTISQUE DECUS ET AMOR" ("terror of the enemies, maker of treaties, and the glory and love of his people"), referring to Louis XV. To the sides of the inscription are statues of the deities Ceres, Minerva, Hercules, and Mars. Above the inscription is an acroterion comprising gilded statues of Minerva, Pax (the Roman goddess personifying peace), and Fama (the Roman goddess personifying glory), all surrounding a medallion of Louis XV. Below the inscription are three marble bas reliefs taken from the old royal gateway that stood here before the construction of the Arc; they were retained for their depictions of Apollo, to whom Louis XV was often compared in imagery and art.

== Gallery ==
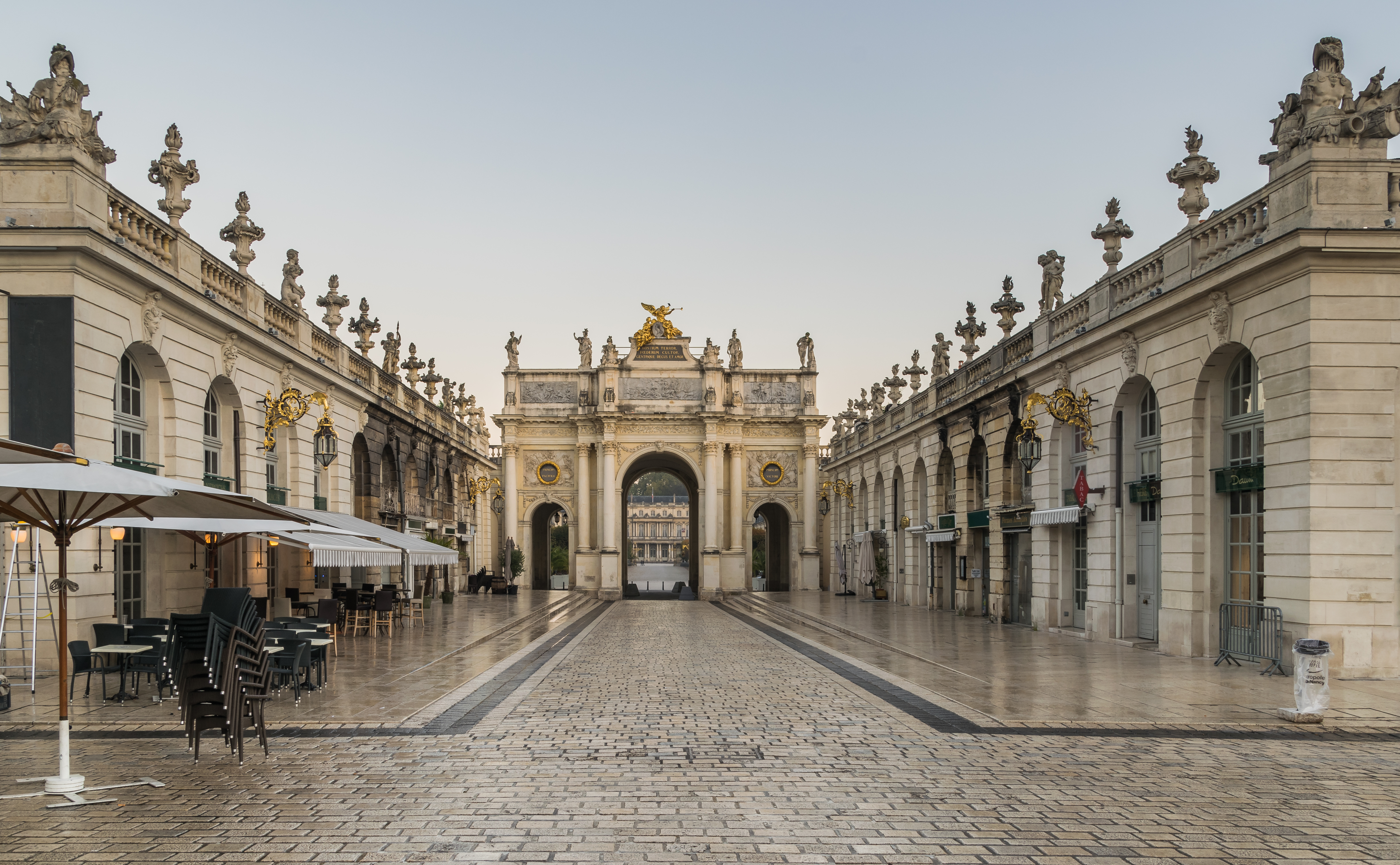
View of the Rue Héré leading up to the Arc Héré from the Place Stanislas

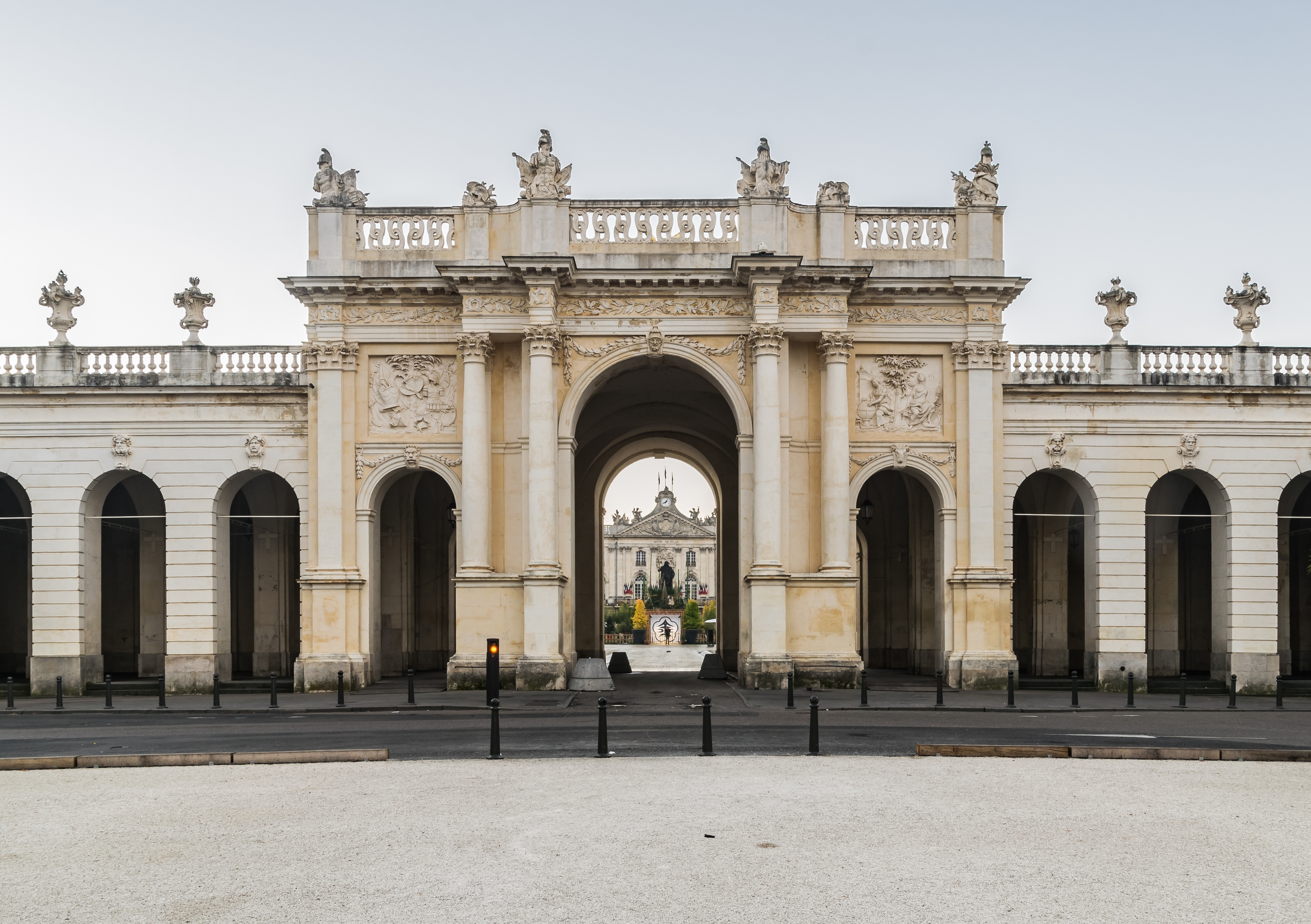
View of the Arc Héré from the Place de la Carrière

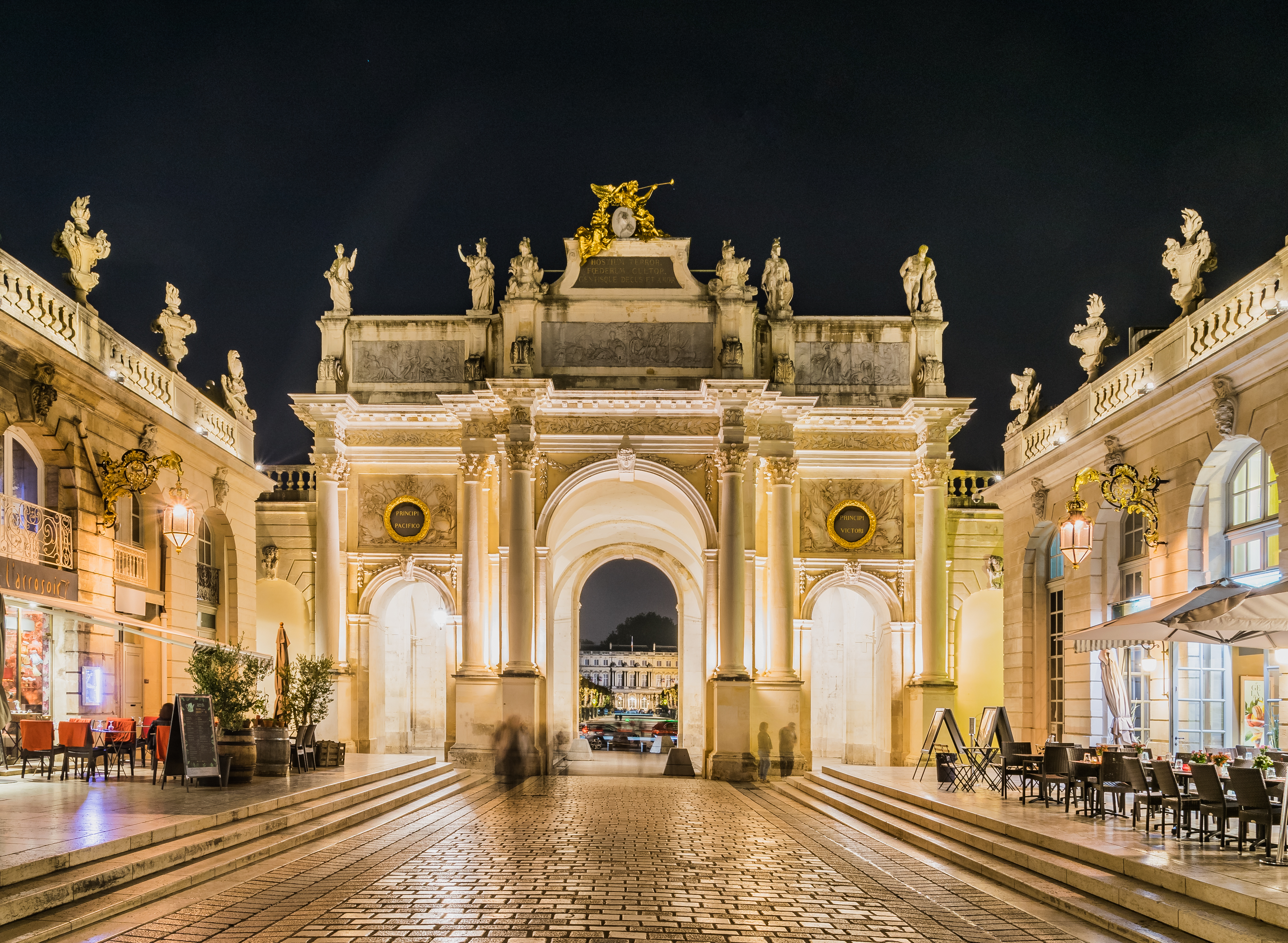
View of the Arc Héré at night from the Place Stanislas

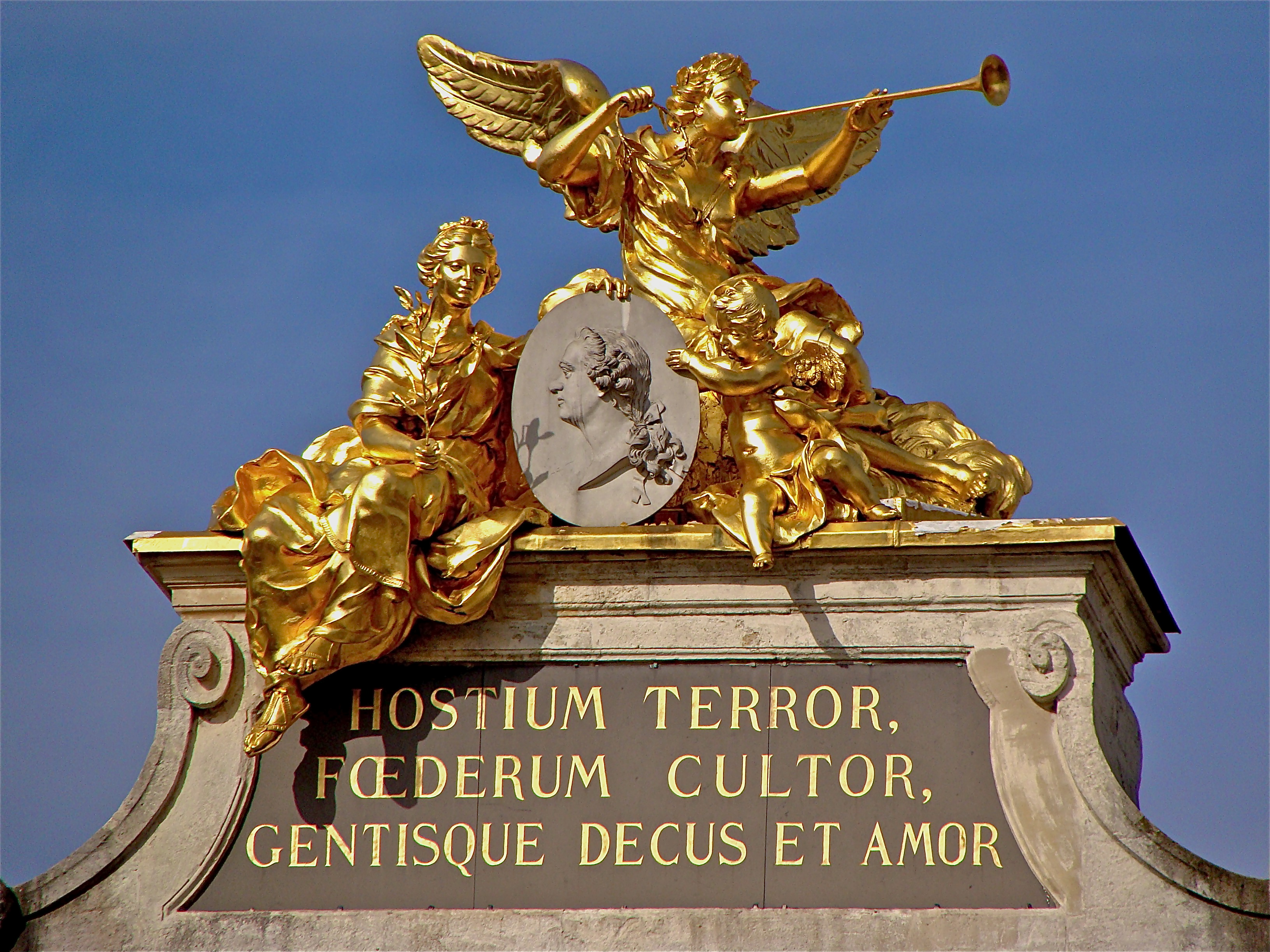
Inscription and acroterion of the Arc Héré
