= Museum of Fine Arts of Nancy =

- Musée des Beaux-Arts de Nancy
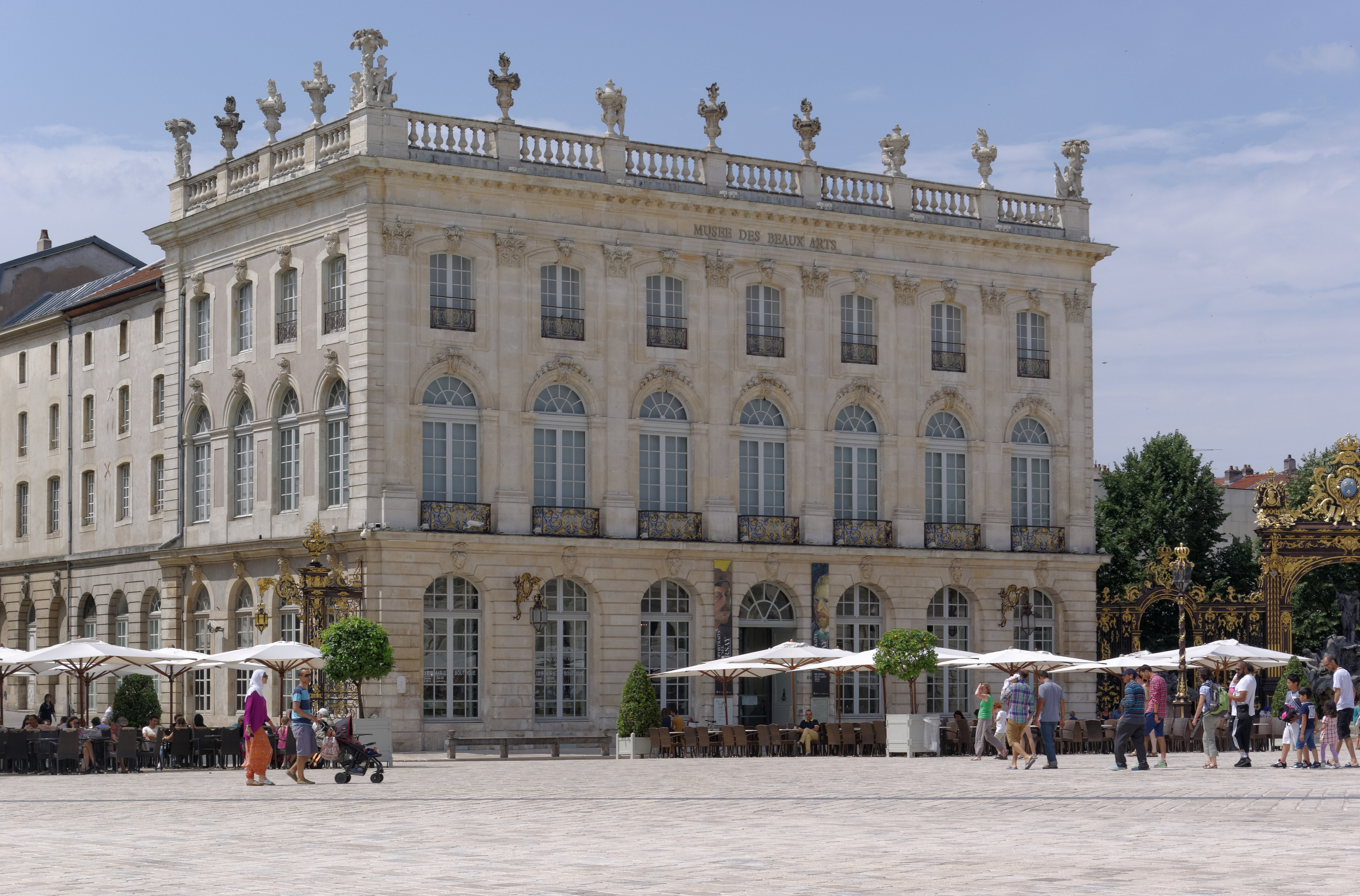
- Museum of Fine Arts of Nancy
- Established: 16 May 1793
- Location: 3 Place Stanislas, 54000 Nancy, France
- Coordinates: 48.6935°N 6.1824°E
- Type: Art museum
- Visitors: 121,134 (2019)
- Curator: Charles Villeneuve de Janti
- Architect: Emmanuel Héré de Corny
- Owner: Jean Prouvé House
- Website: musee-des-beaux-arts.nancy.fr/en-2689.html

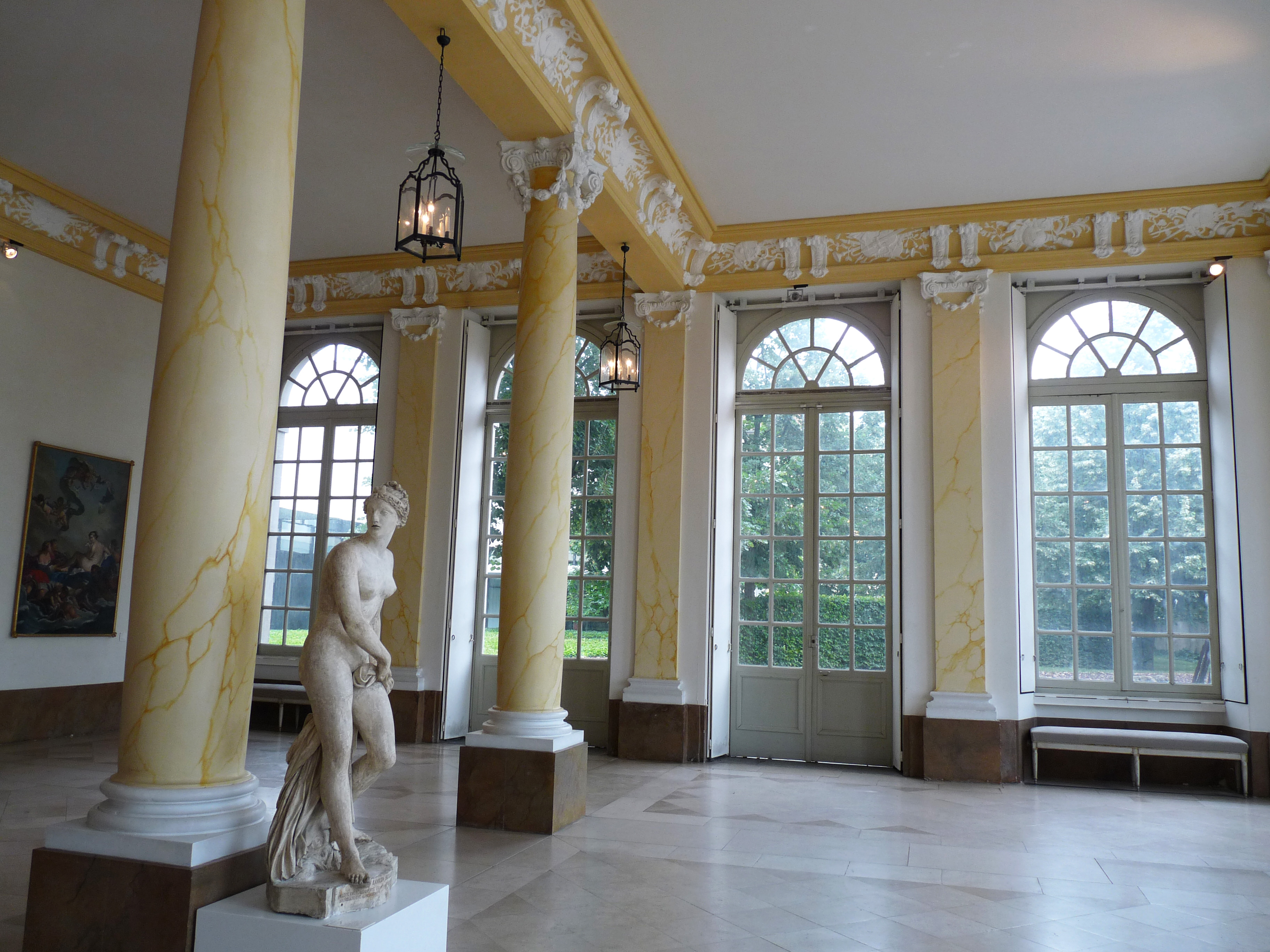
Peristyle of the old pavilion

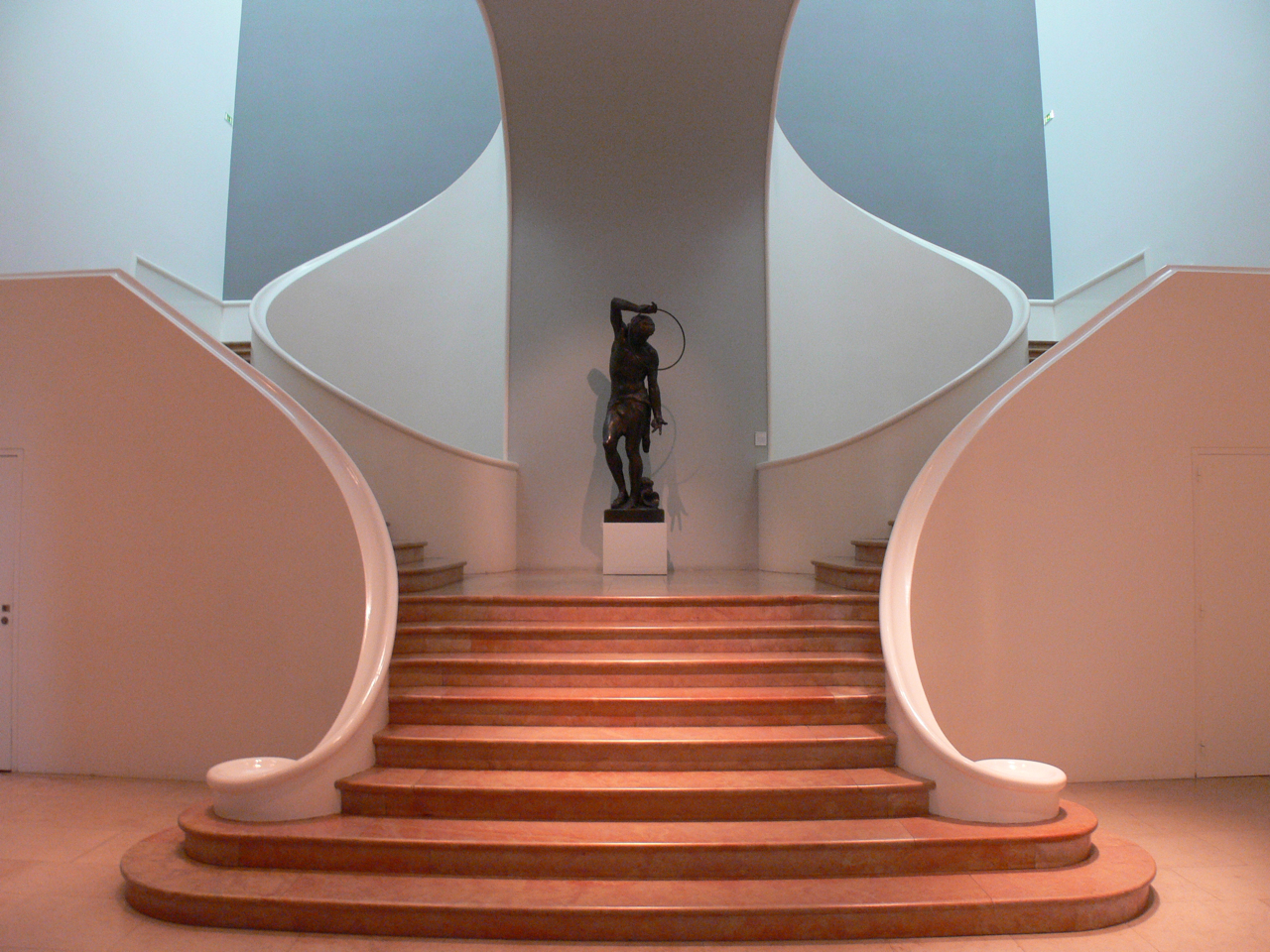
Staircase of the extension from the 1930s

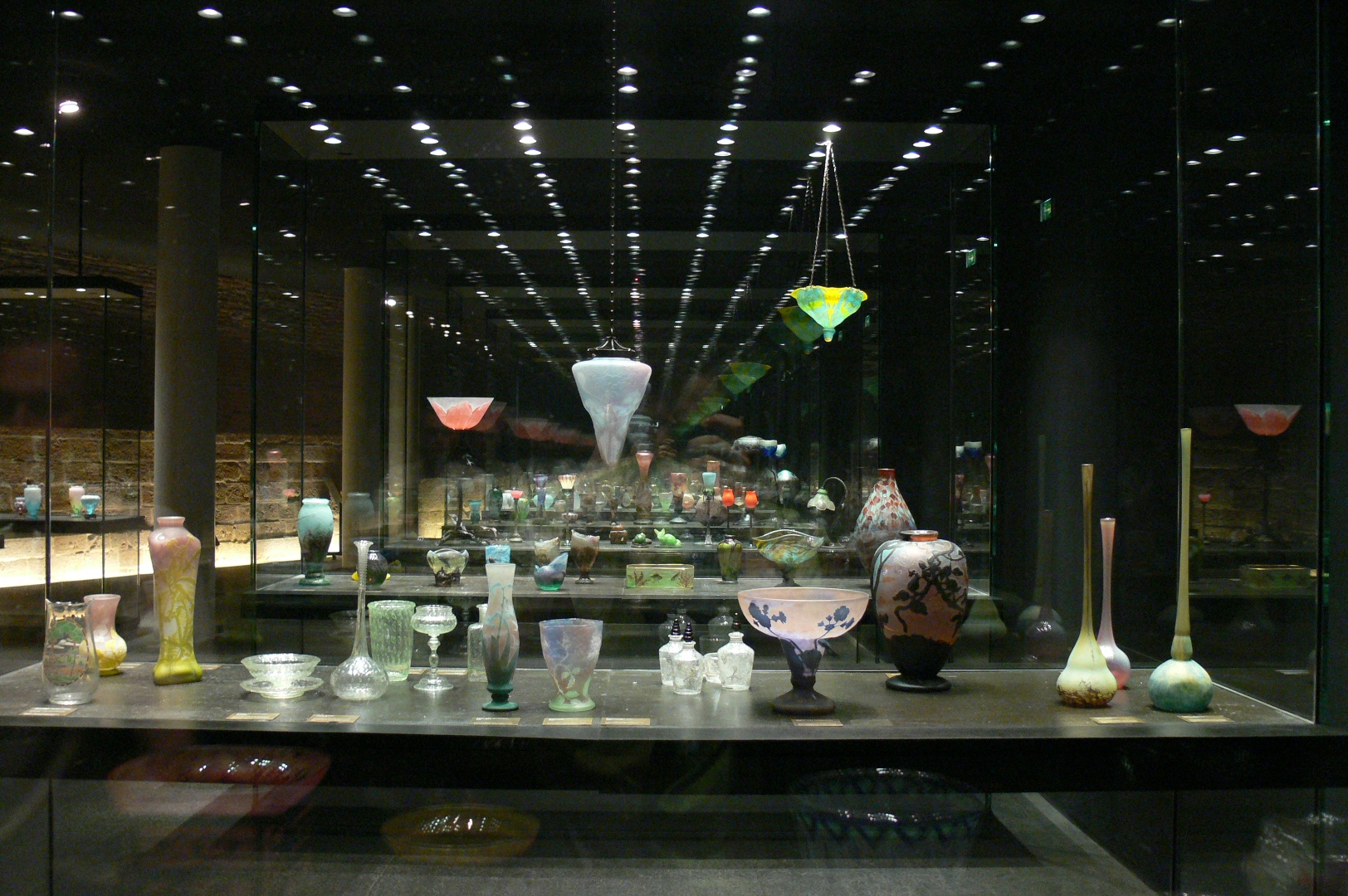
Daum collection

The Museum of Fine Arts of Nancy (French: Musée des Beaux-Arts de Nancy), one of the oldest museums in France, is housed in one of the pavilions on the Place Stanislas, in the heart of the 18th-century urban ensemble, a World Heritage Site by UNESCO. The museum displays an important collection of European paintings and is largely open to design, including a gallery dedicated to Jean Prouvé or the Daum factory.

== History ==
The Museum of Fine Arts of Nancy is one of the oldest in France. Its foundation intervenes, as for other French museum institutions, during the revolutionary period. The first collections are made from the seizures of the property of the clergy or aristocratic families who emigrate to flee France and the Revolution.

Under the First Empire, with the signing of the peace treaty between France and Austria in Lunéville in 1801, Napoleon I brought 30 paintings from the Central Museum in Lorraine (now the Louvre Museum). Thus, the museum of Nancy receives a large set of French paintings of the seventeenth and eighteenth centuries. The same year, the museum enjoys, like 15 other museums in France, shipments of works under the Chaptal decree. These paintings come from seized French collections or Napoleonic conquests in Italy. Among the first works to form the collections of the Musée des Beaux-Arts in Nancy, some are orders from the ducal family of Lorraine:

- The Annunciation by Caravaggio (1608)
- a copy of the famous The Wedding of Cana (Veronese) made by Claude Charles in 1702 for the convent of Cordeliers Nancy.

In 1930, the town council decided to convert the building into a museum in order to host the fine art collection hitherto held in the city hall.

The museum, called "museum", changes several times in its early history, before being installed by the City Council of 18 May 1825 in the City Hall of Nancy.

1791 - 1792: Hotel of the University of Nancy (ground floor) 1793 - 1804: old disused chapel of the Convent of the Visitation 1804 - 1814: premises of the old university, current Bibliothèque Patrimoniale de Nancy 1814 - 1828: former Royal College of Medicine (current pavilion occupied by the museum) 1828 - 1936: Nancy Town Hall In 1936, he moved to the pavilion he still occupies at Stanislas, the former Royal College of Medicine. The museum then benefits from an extension due to Jacques and Michel André.

== Architecture ==
The pavilion that houses the museum since 1936 belongs to the ensemble designed by the architect Emmanuel Héré in the mid-eighteenth century for the former King of Poland and Duke of Lorraine and Bar, Stanislas. The main facade thus presents a classical style, in a rocaille set inscribed on the World Heritage List by UNESCO. This pavilion is installed on the old fortifications of Nancy, including the bastion of Haussonville (15th century), which the visitor can discover at level -1 of the museum.

In 1936, the pavilion was modernized and extended by architects Jacques and Michel André, laureate of the architectural competition launched by the municipality for the museum, 5 years earlier. The architects propose a wing in the continuity of the XVIIIe pavilion, on two levels. The garden facade is an important part of the architects' project and will be taken up again in 2019 for the poster of the exhibition organized on the occasion of the 20th anniversary of the second renovation of the establishment. The double-decker staircase, with Art Deco lines, all in concrete, is the other highlight of this extension.

In February 1999, after spectacular extension work (including a major archaeological excavation), a new contemporary wing designed by Laurent Beaudouin's agency was inaugurated. The exhibition surfaces are then multiplied by two, an auditorium is created. In 2001, a storage's room dedicated to the conservation of graphic arts was set up to accommodate a large donation, then anonymous, of more than 15,000 works. The name of the donors is revealed in 2011, with the death of Jacques Thuiller. The donation today bears the name of Jacques and Guy Thuiller.

In 2000, Felice Varini made inside the museum Ellipse orange évidée par sept disques, an anamorphosis visible from several floors. In 2002 was installed L'Hommage à Lamour, a work created in situ by François Morellet. Visible from the Place Stanislas and placed on the building of conservation, it is about a large horizontal white rectangle, with in each corner neon yellow curved in volutes.

In 2012, the museum reopens its doors following lighting and energy saving. A new museography is then born, integrating the creation of a space dedicated to Jean Prouvé. At level -1, a gallery is dedicated to Daum glassworks. Spaces are also reserved for graphic or Asian arts. The large collection of paintings is displayed in the 18th century pavilion in chronological order. In 2018, the permanent route is reworked to include works from the Lorrain Museum, deposited during the renovation of the Palace of the Dukes of Lorraine. In the future, the museum intends to develop the presentation of contemporary creation.

== Collection ==
Some of the painters whose work is featured in the collections are Perugino, Tintoretto, Jan Brueghel the Younger, Caravaggio, Georges de La Tour, Charles Le Brun, Ribera, Rubens, Claude Gellée (known as Le Lorrain and Claude), Luca Giordano, François Boucher, Eugène Delacroix, Édouard Manet, Claude Monet, Paul Signac, Modigliani, Picasso, Raoul Dufy, Constance Mayer...

15th-18th century art

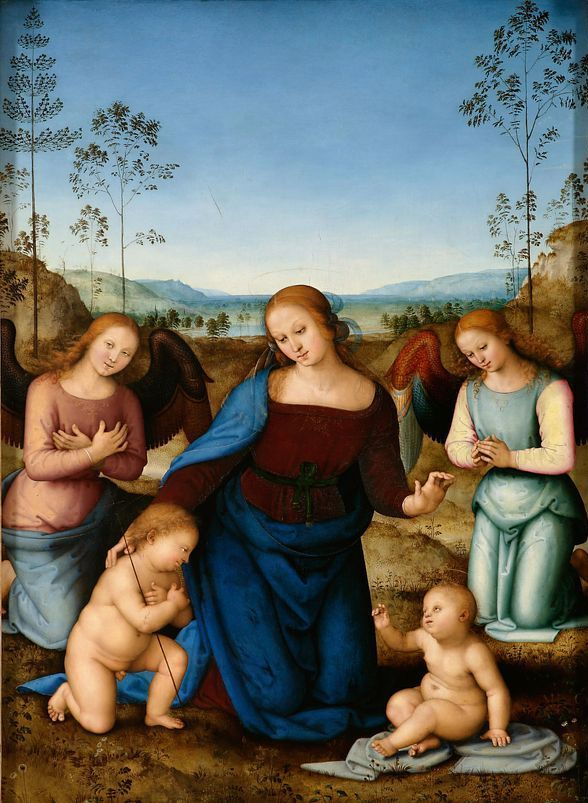
Perugino, The Virgin and Child with Saint John and two Angels

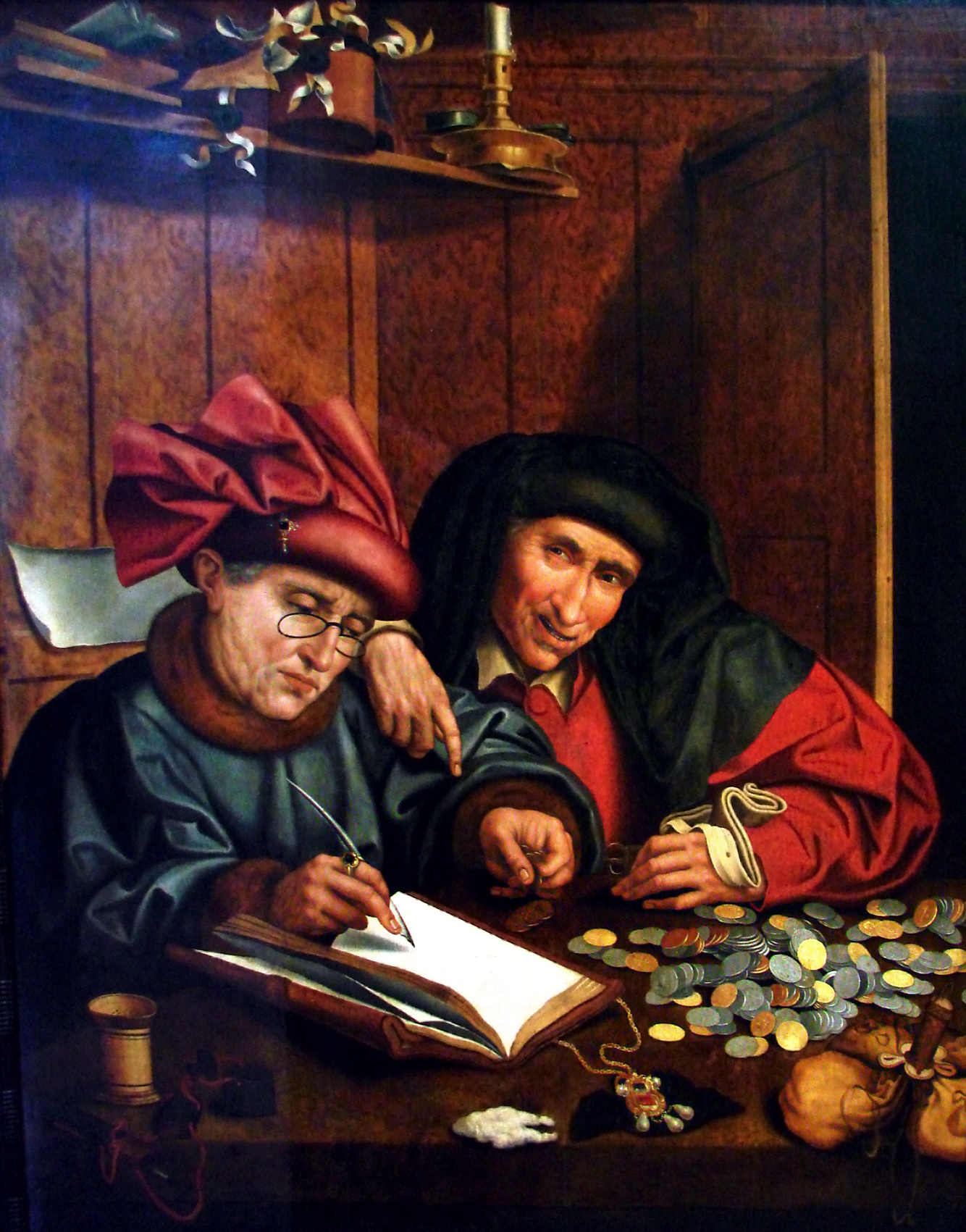
Anonymous, Tax collectors (1575-1600)

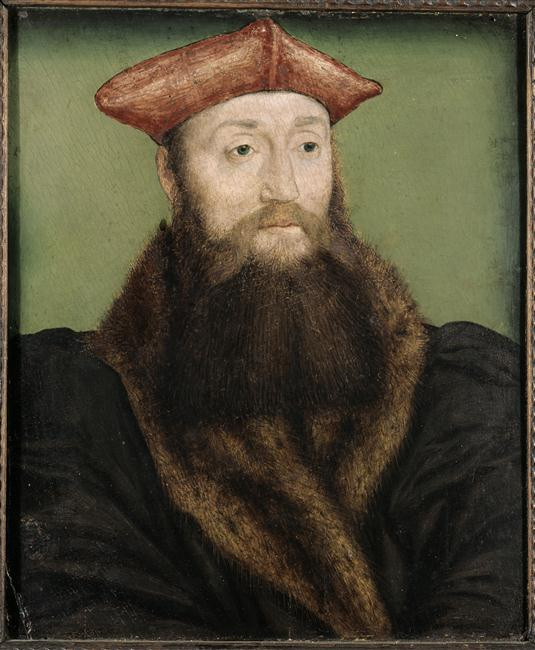
Corneille de Lyon, Portrait of Robert de Lénoncourt

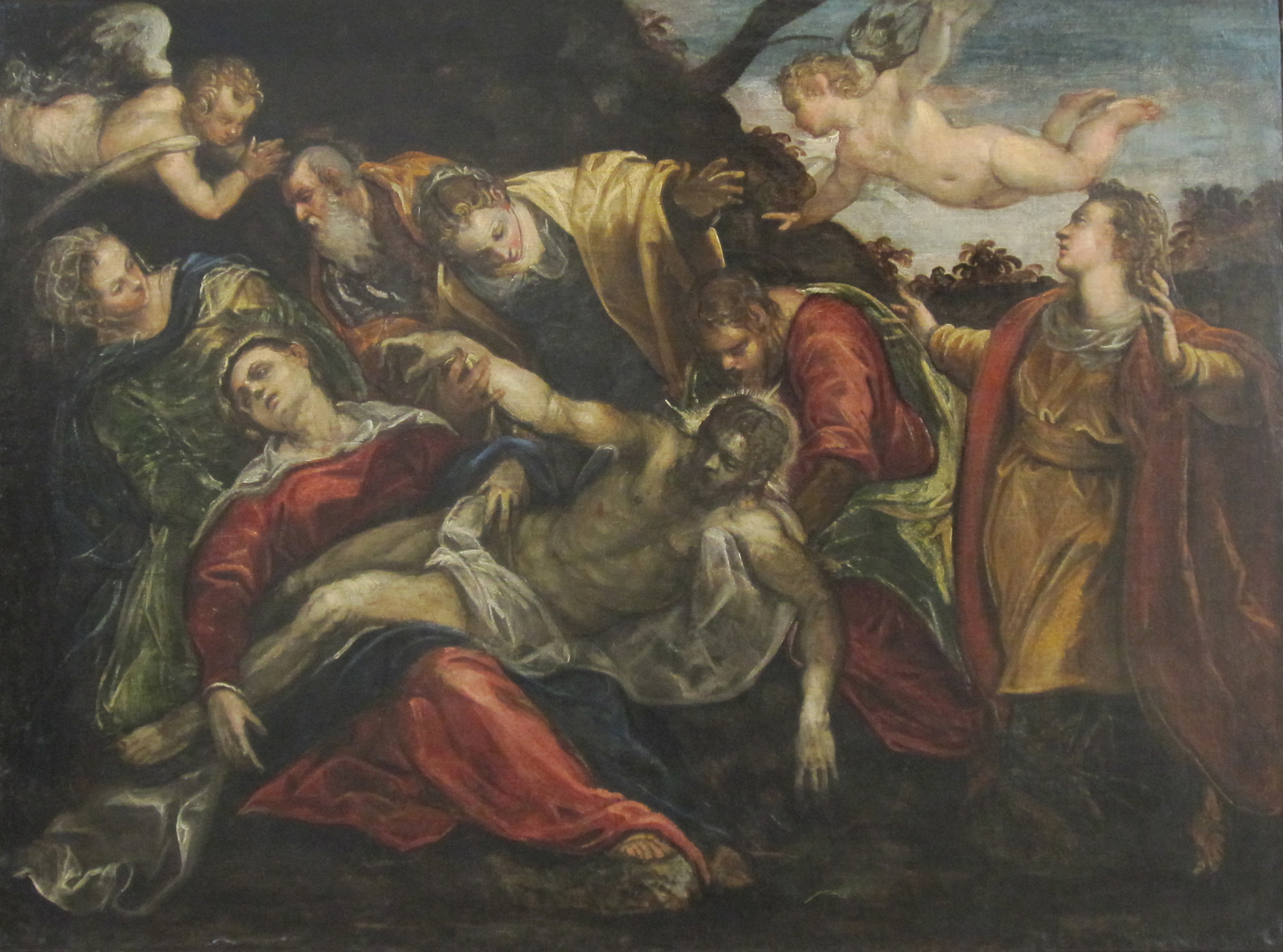
Tintoretto, Lamentation of Christ

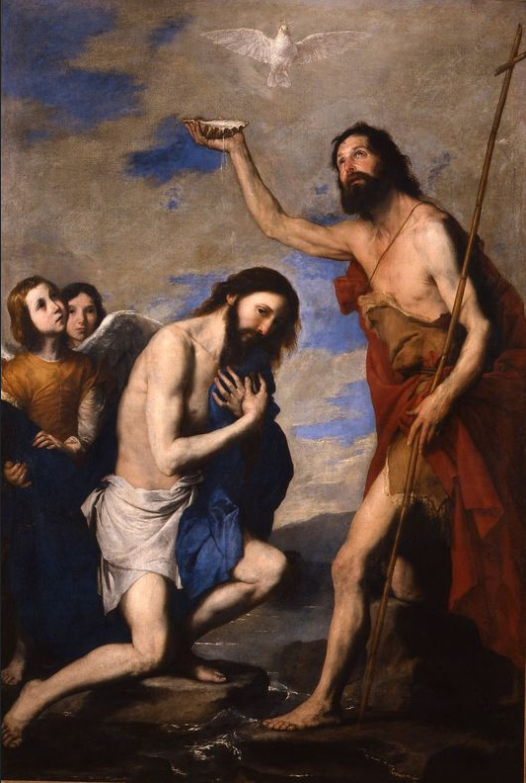
José de Ribera (1591-1652)

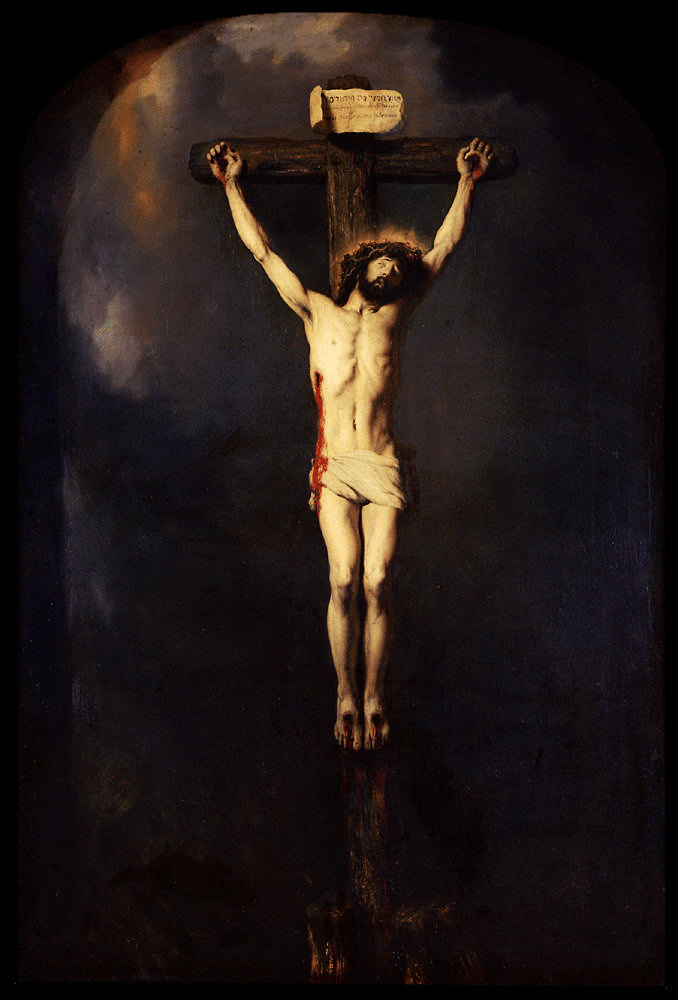
Jan Lievens (1607-1674), Crucifixion

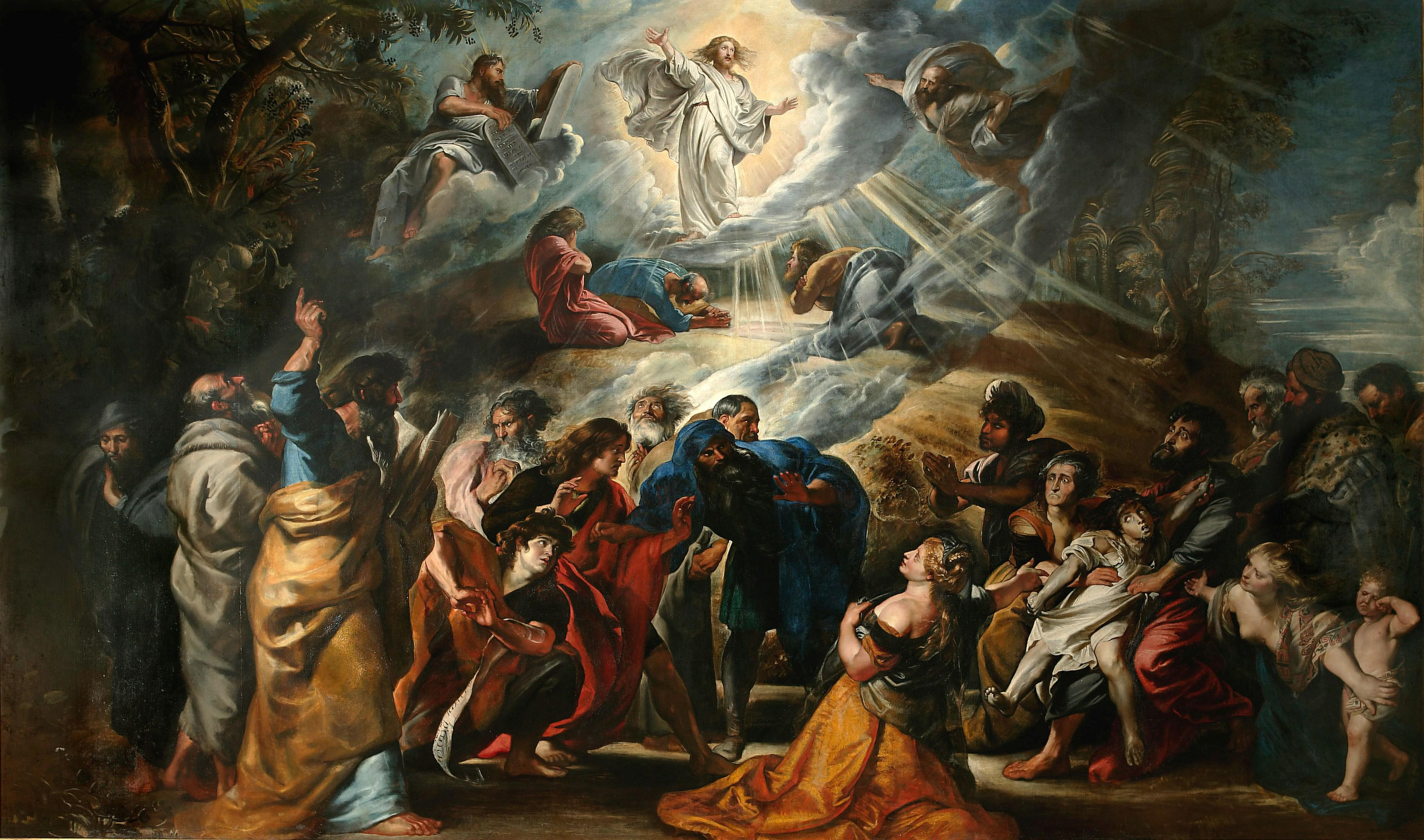
Rubens, Transfiguration of Christ

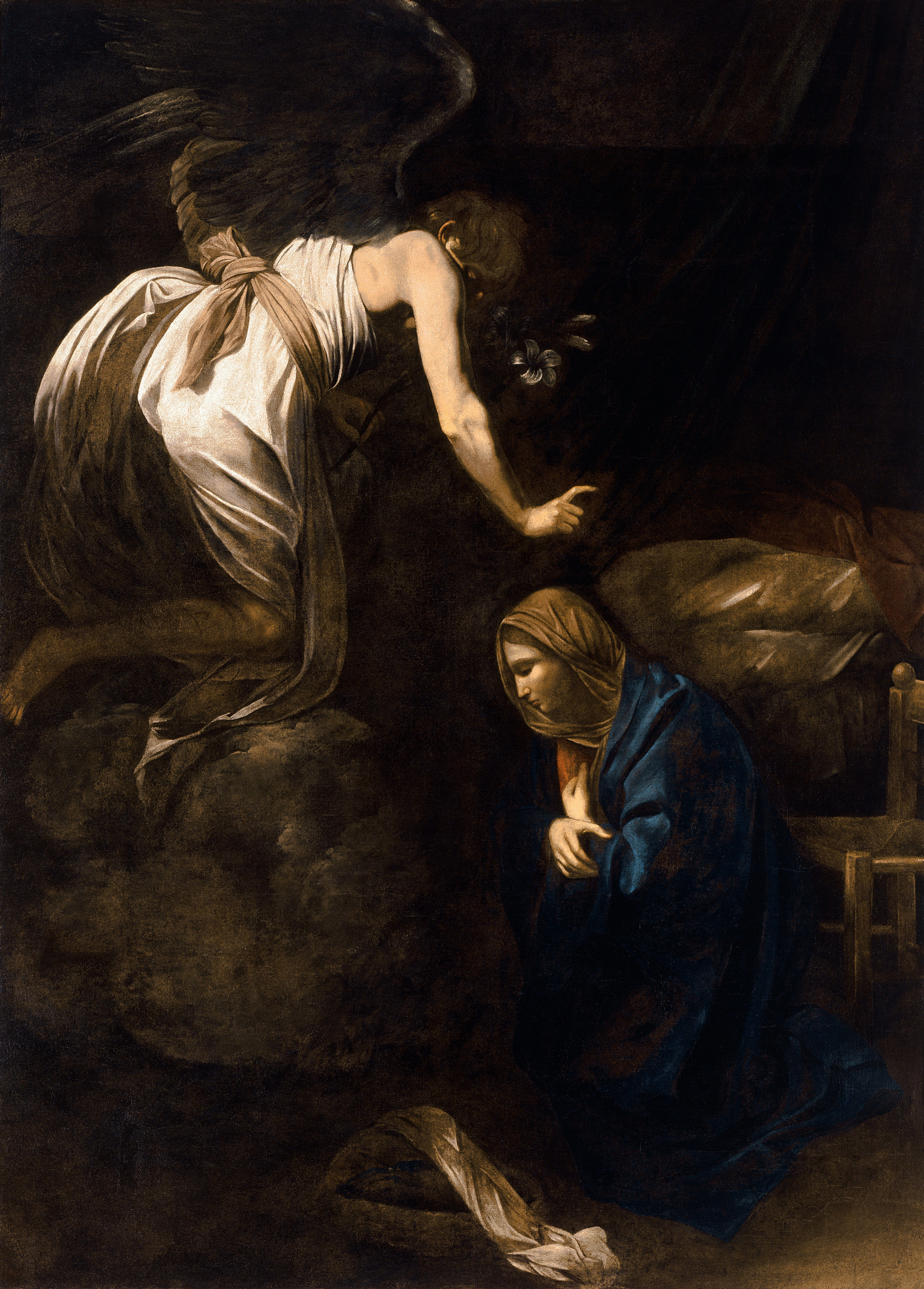
Caravaggio, Annunciation

19th-20th century art

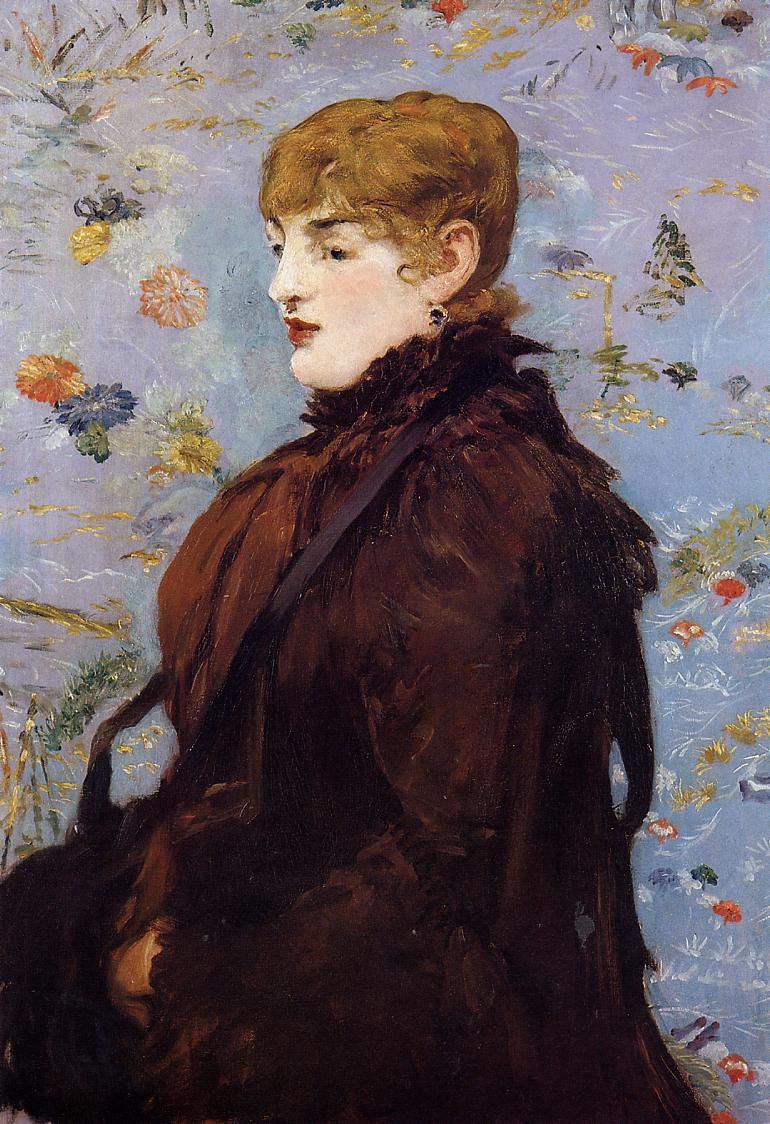
Édouard Manet (1832-1883)

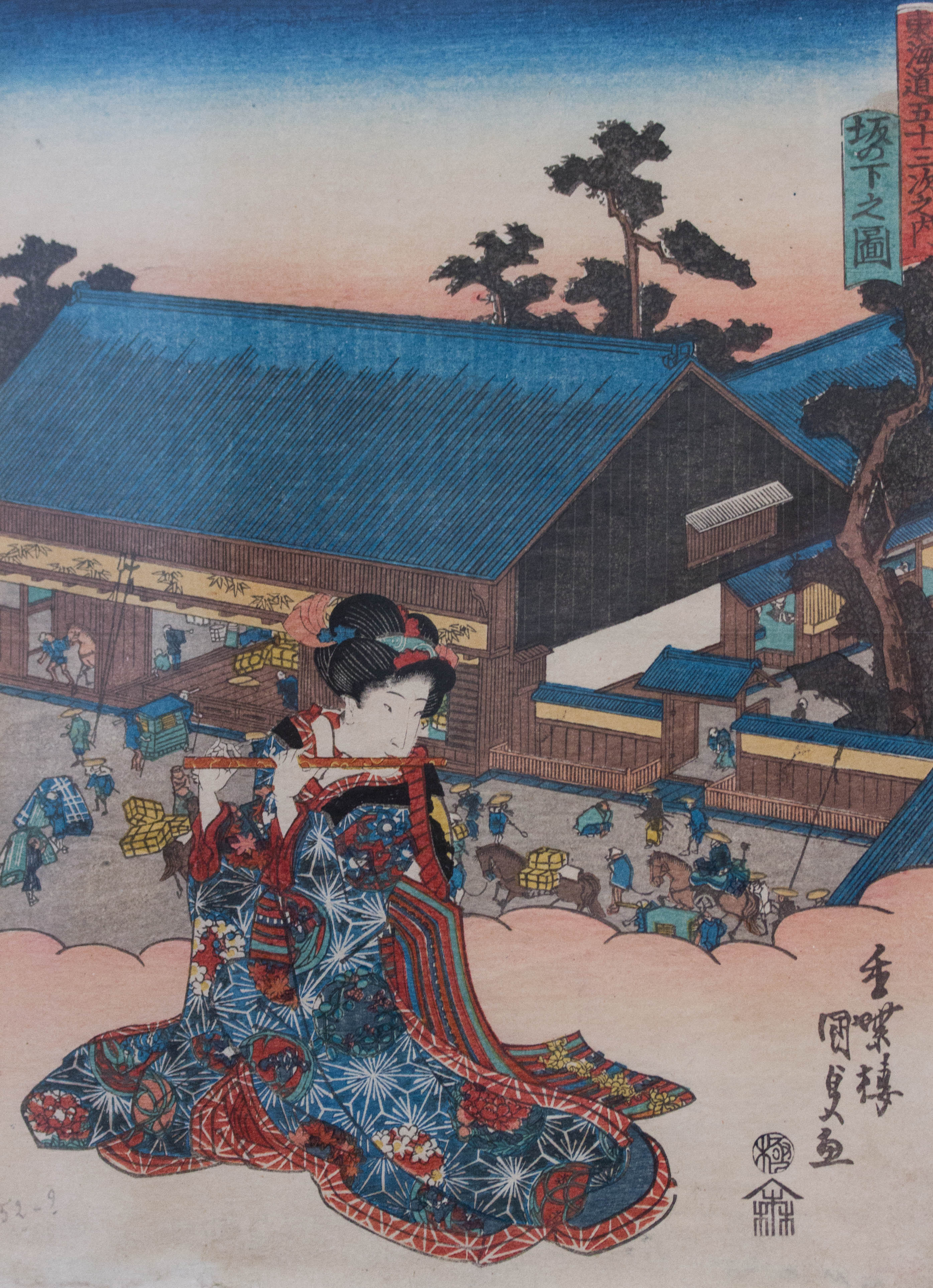
Utagawa Kunisada, View of Sakanoshita (Sakanoshita no zu), from the series Fifty-Three Stations of the Tōkaidō with Beauties

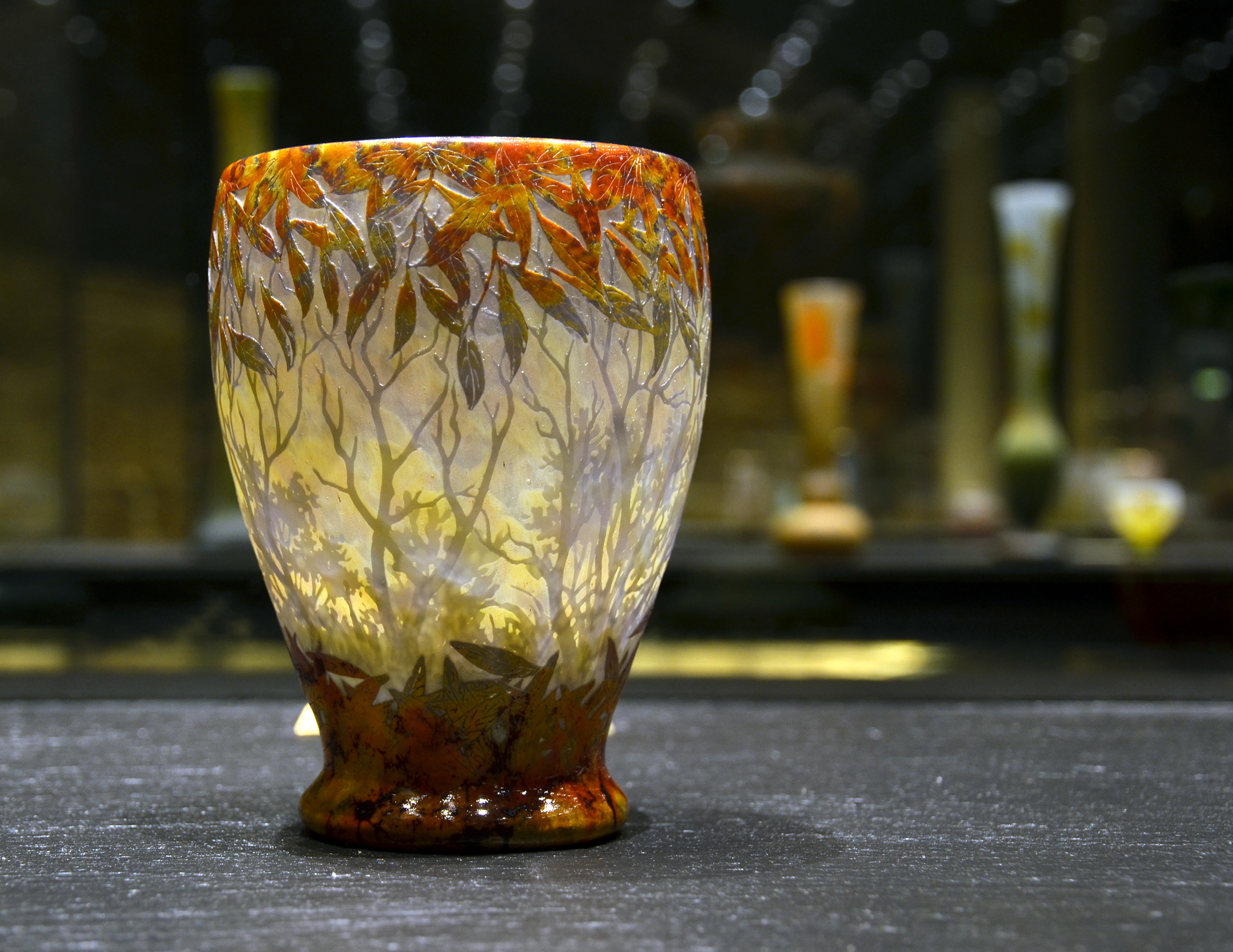
Vase from Daum

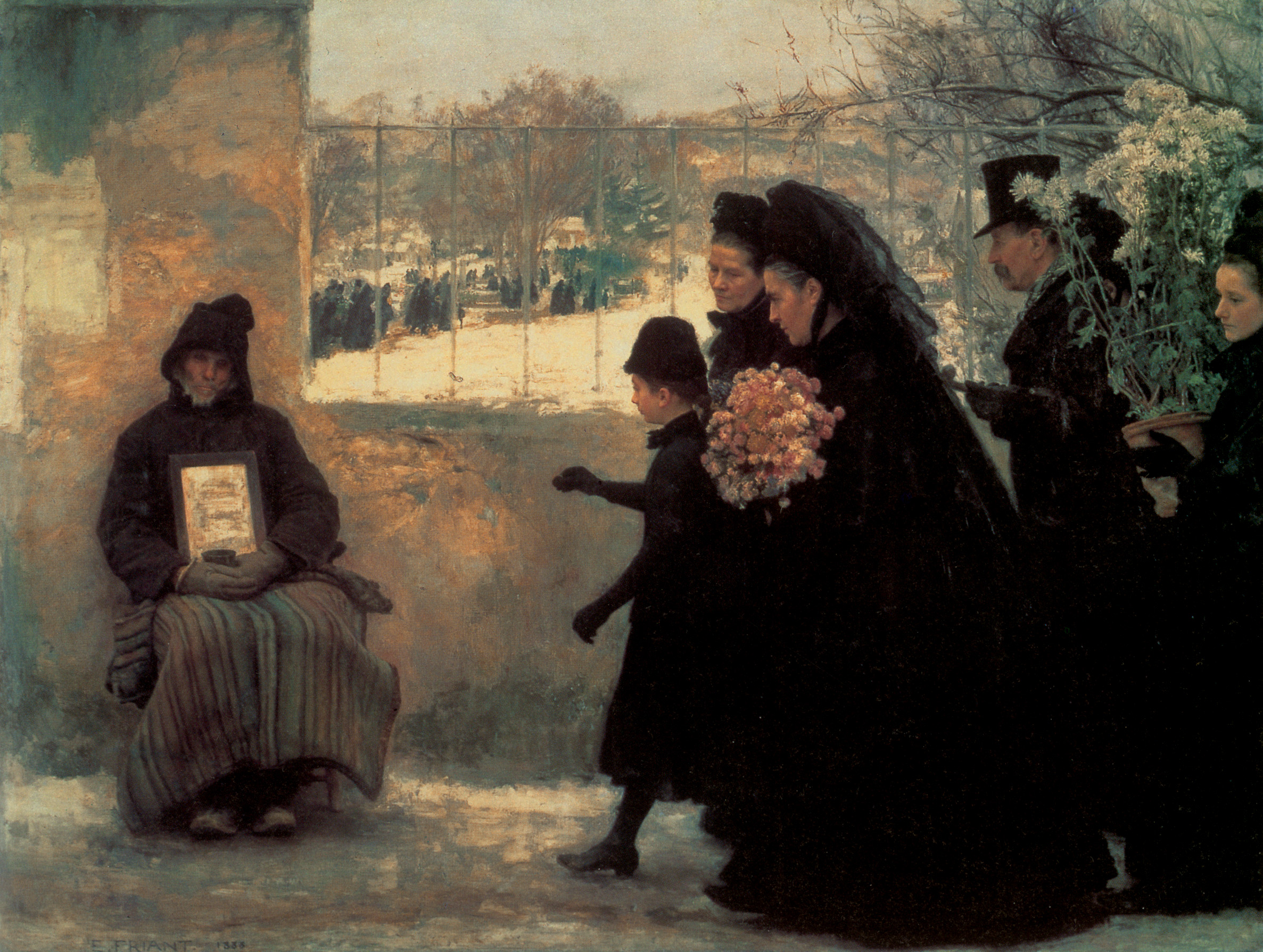
Émile Friant (1863-1932)

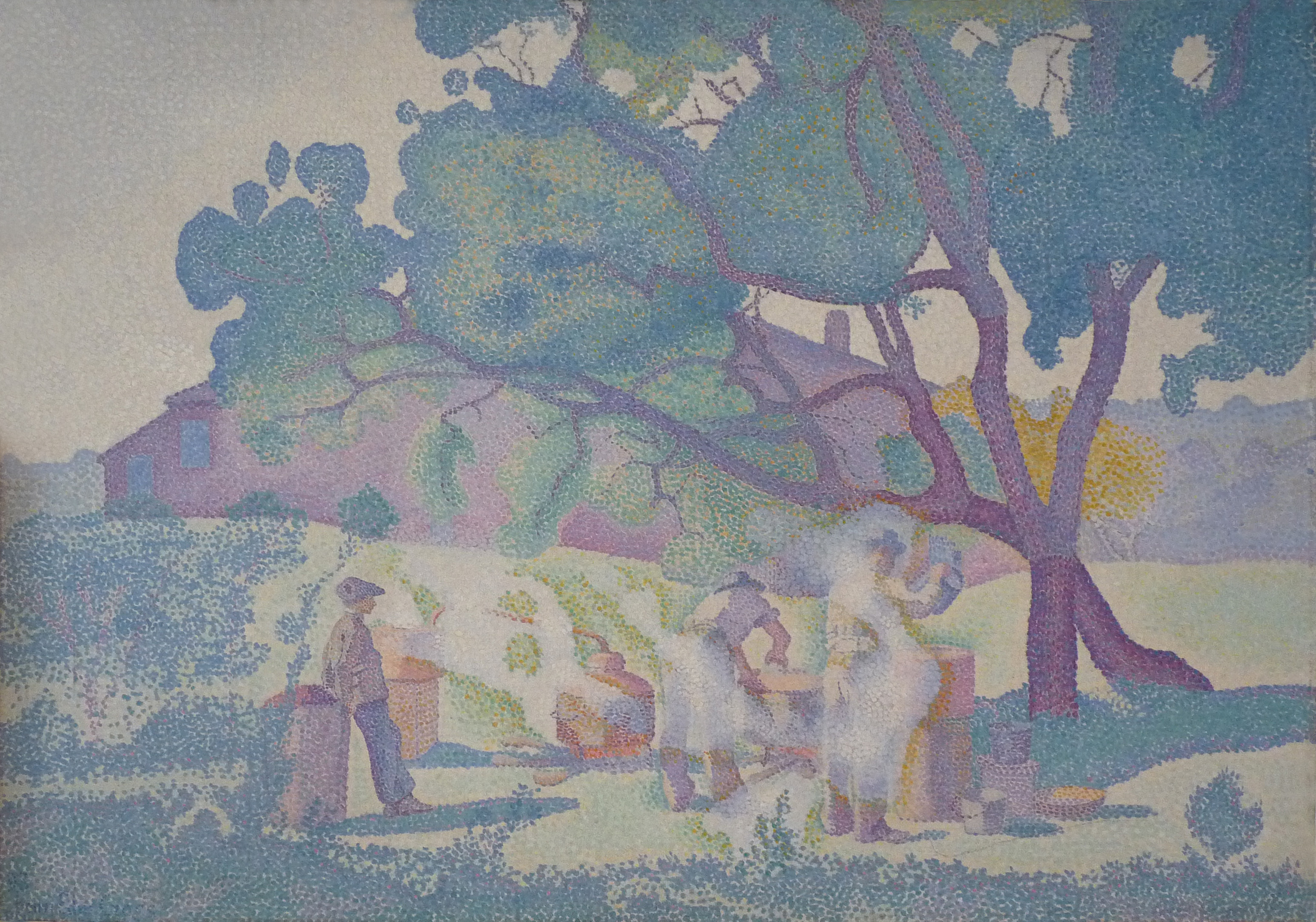
Henri-Edmond Cross, La Ferme, matin

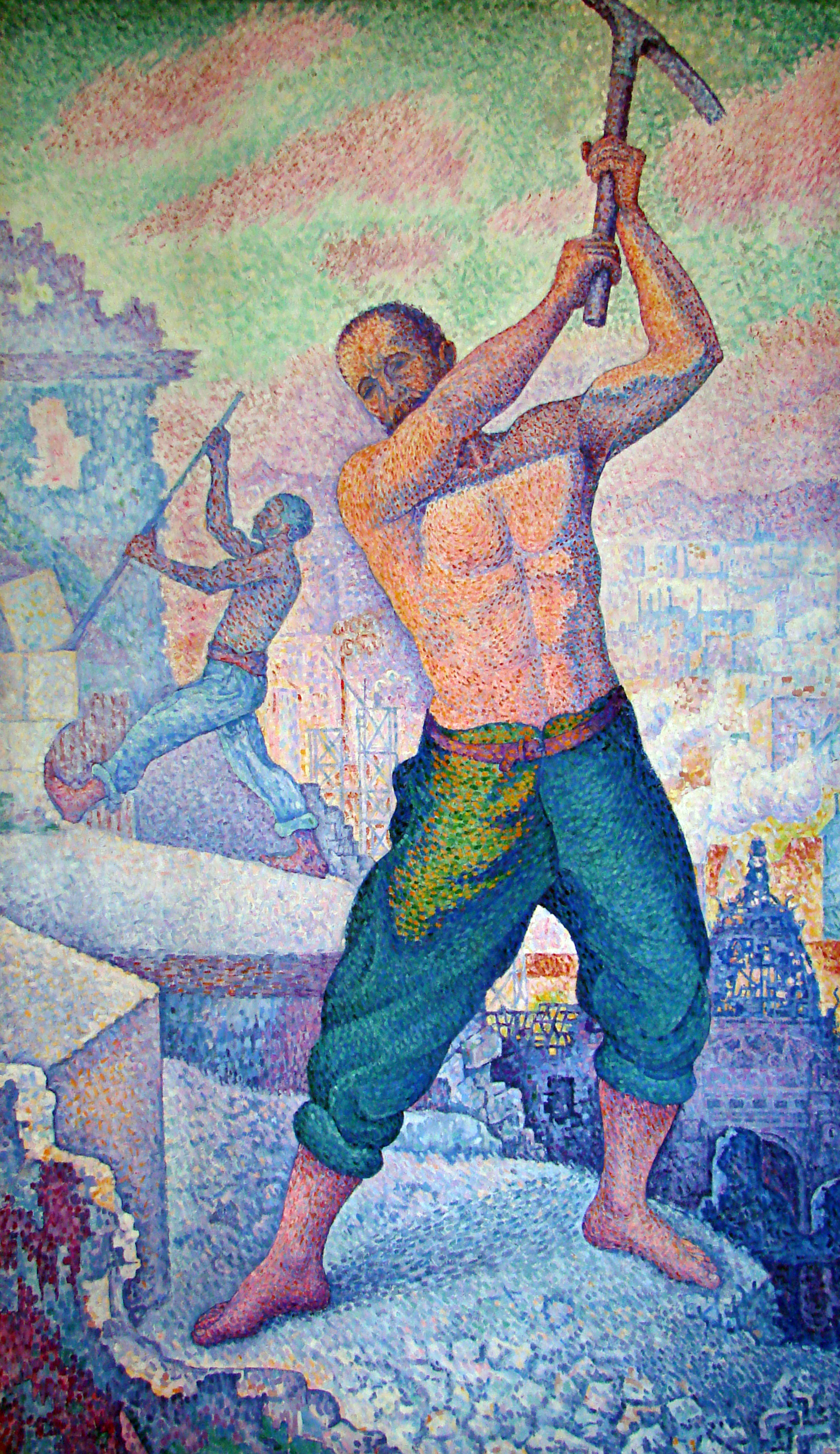
Paul Signac, The Demolisher (1863-1935)

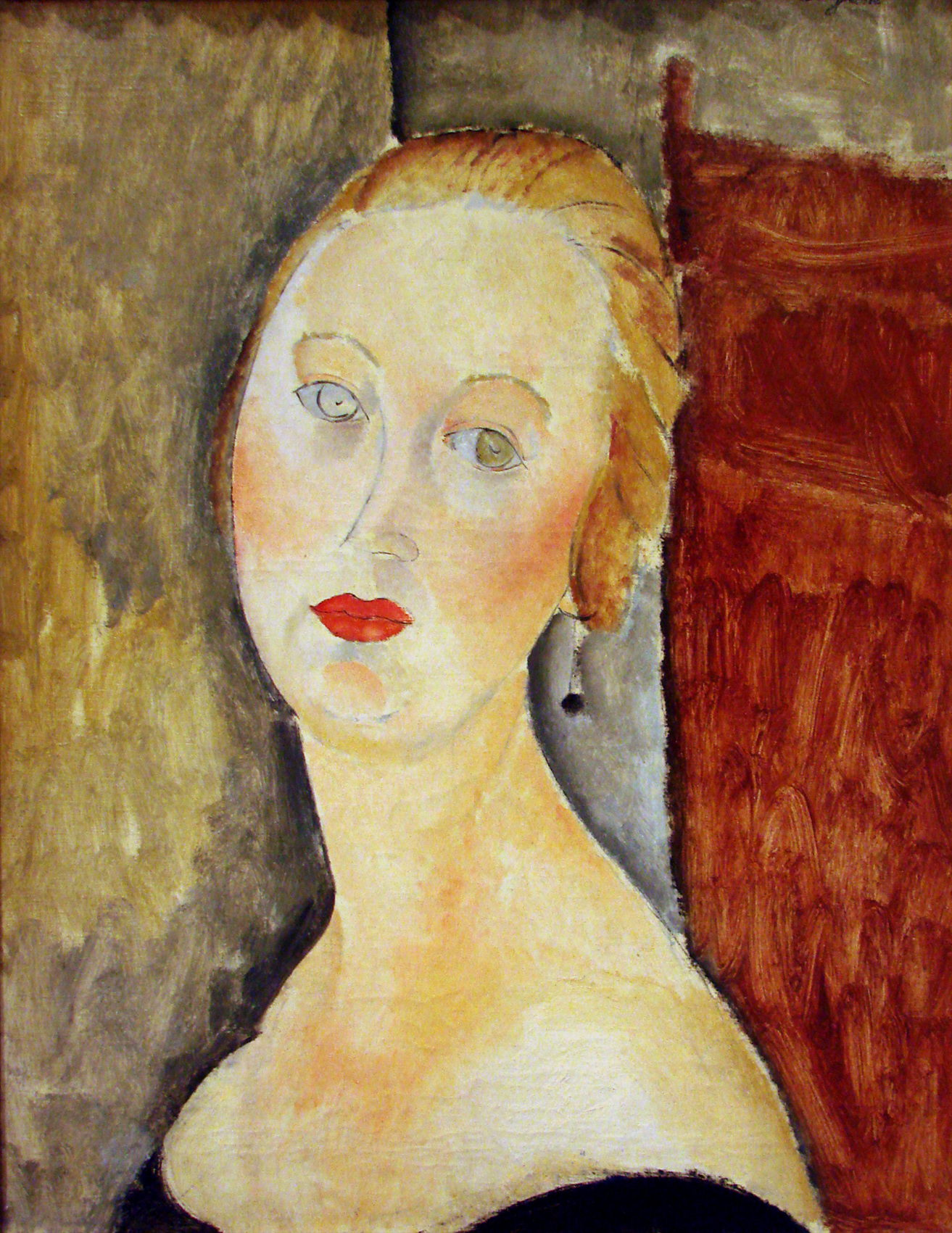
Amedeo Modigliani (1884-1920)

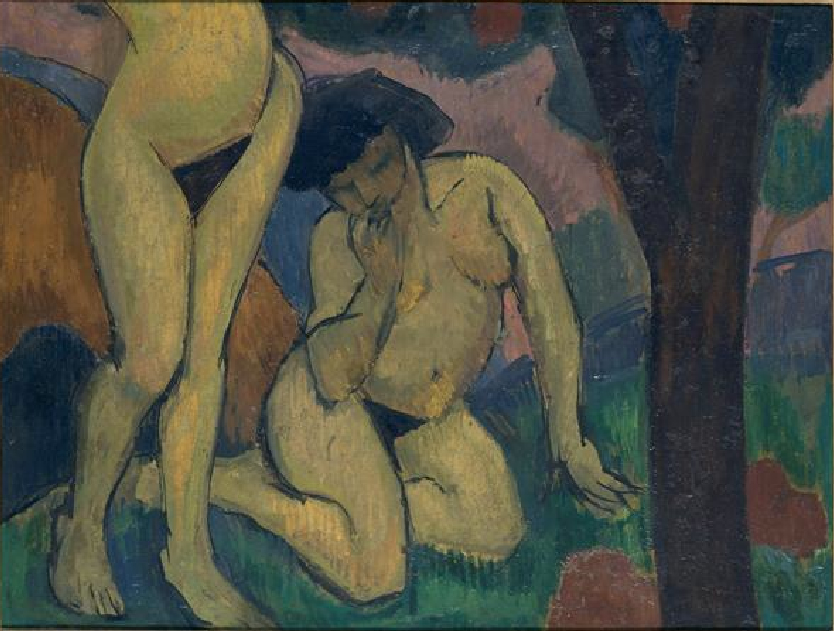
Roger de La Fresnaye, Two naked women in a landscape

== See also ==
- Musée de l'École de Nancy
