= Place Stanislas =

UNESCO World Heritage Site
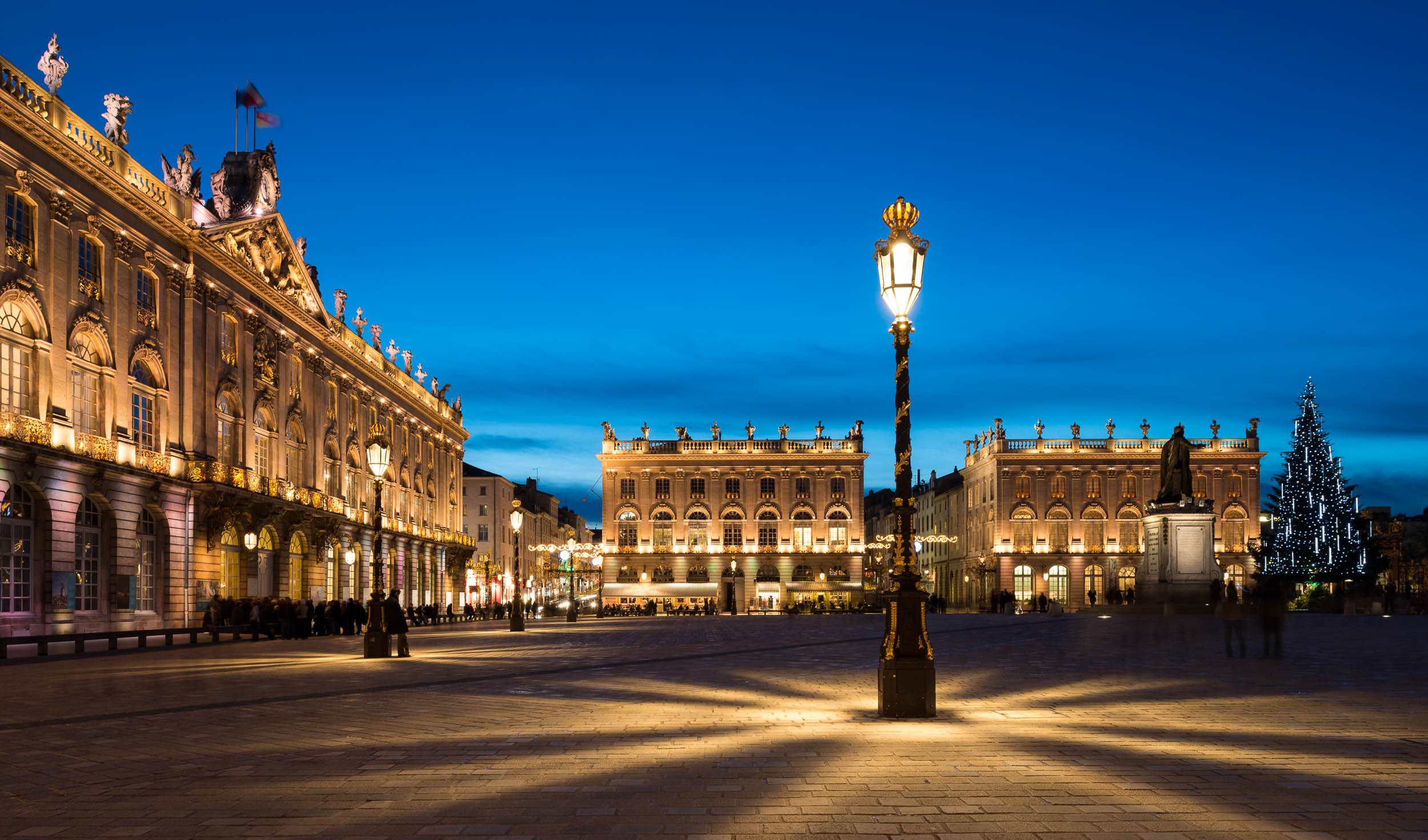

- Location within Grand Est Location within France
- Location: Nancy, Lorraine, Grand Est, France
- Part of: Place Stanislas, Place de la Carrière and Place d'Alliance in Nancy
- Criteria: Cultural: (i), (iv)
- Reference: 229bis
- Inscription: 1983 (7th Session)
- Extensions: 2016
- Area: 7 ha (17 acres)
- Buffer zone: 159 ha (390 acres)
- Coordinates: 48°41′37″N 6°10′59″E

The Place Stanislas is a large pedestrianised square in the French city of Nancy, in the Lorraine historic region. Built between 1752 and 1756 on the orders of Stanislaus I, former King of Poland and Grand Duke of Lithuania, then Duke of Lorraine, the square is one of the oldest examples of an architecturally consistent monumental public square and is an excellent example of 18th-century urban architecture. Since 1983, the architectural ensemble comprising the Place Stanislas, the extension of its axis, the Place de la Carrière and the Place d'Alliance, has been a UNESCO World Heritage Site.

== History ==
=== Background ===
After the War of the Polish Succession in 1737, the Duchy of Upper Lorraine, of which Nancy was the capital, was given to Stanislaus I Leszczyński (Stanisław in Polish, Stanislas in French), former King of Poland and father-in-law to King Louis XV of France. An earlier ruler, Leopold, Duke of Lorraine, had undertaken much reconstruction in Lorraine, which had been ravaged by a series of wars. He had recruited numerous artists and architects for this work, including Germain Boffrand, who trained Emmanuel Héré. Hence, Stanislaus found a pool of talent and experience to draw from on his arrival.

=== Design and construction ===
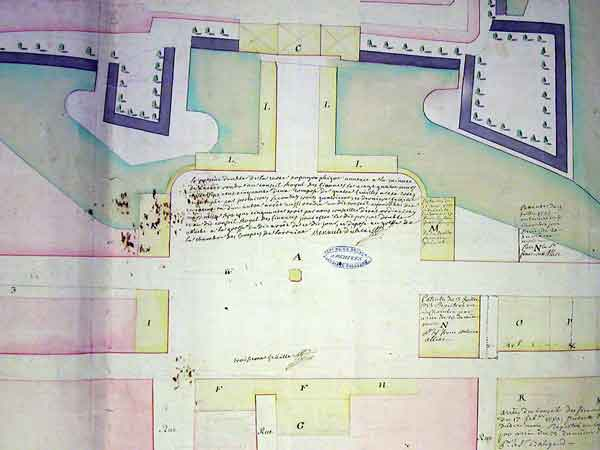
Plan of the square, 1752

The square was a major project in urban planning, conceived by Stanislaus I of Poland as a way to link the medieval old town of Nancy and the "new" town built in the 17th century under Charles III, Duke of Lorraine. The square was also intended as a place royale to honour Stanislaus' son-in-law, Louis XV. The design created a large urban square or place that linked two handsome existing buildings: the Hôtel de Ville (city hall, now centred on its grand square) and the Hôtel du Gouvernement, the seat of the duchy. The seat of city government and the seat of Ducal government thus faced each other as complements through a series of rational, symmetrical but varied urban spaces, unequalled in Europe at the time.

The square and the surrounding buildings, unified by their colossal orders, were designed by the royal architect Emmanuel Héré de Corny (1705–1763). Construction began in March 1752, and ended in November 1755. Barthélémy Guibal and Paul-Louis Cyfflé created a bronze statue of Louis XV that was erected in the center of the square. It was removed during the iconoclasm of the Revolution, when it was replaced with a simple winged figure. The square was renamed the 'Place du Peuple', and later the 'Place Napoléon'.

In 1831, a bronze statue of Stanislaus was placed in the middle of the square; since then it has been known as the 'Place Stanislas'.

The square has always been used for public assemblies and festivities. It has undergone several makeovers in its history and, in a low period of appreciation, served as a car parking area for nearly a quarter of a century, between 1958 and 1983.

The city has since reserved it for pedestrian use. In 2004 and 2005, the city undertook a massive restoration of the square, based on the original 18th-century plans. The ten-month project cost approximately 9 million euros. It was financed by a combination of city and local, regional, national and private funds. The inauguration of the new Place Stanislas, in May 2005, coincided with the square's 250th anniversary.

== Description ==
Layout of the square

The Place Stanislas is 125 metres (410 ft) long and 106 metres (348 ft) wide. It is paved with light ochre stones, with two lines of darker stones forming a diagonal cross motif. The square is surrounded by an architecturally harmonious ensemble of buildings, most notably these:

- The City Hall (Hôtel de Ville) of Nancy, which occupies the entire south side of the square, with the prefectural office of Meurthe-et-Moselle at the south-east corner;
- To the east, the Opera house (formerly the Bishop's Palace) and the Grand Hôtel (originally the Hôtel de la Reine, actually occupied by the Intendant Alliot);
- To the west, the Fine Arts Museum (originally the Collège de médecine) and the Pavillon Jacquet (originally a commercial/residential building, now mostly offices);
- On the north side, the buildings were kept lower for defensive purposes (to permit crossfire between the Vaudemont and the Haussonville bastions).

The Arc Héré, a triumphal arch built by Emmanuel Héré de Corny, stands in the centre of the fourth side, leading to the adjoining Place de la Carrière, where the main axis is developed as a double avenue of trees, with symmetrical buildings facing each other down its length.

The far end is defined by the hemi-cycles of colonnades that enclose the sides and are carried across the pre-existing façade of the Palais du Gouvernement.

The four corners and the west and east sides of the square feature gilded wrought iron gates and lanterns, created by Jean Lamour (1698–1771); who was also responsible for the wrought iron balustrade on the main staircase in the Hôtel de Ville, and the balcony across the centre of its main façade. The north-west and north-east corners also feature ornate fountains designed by Barthélémy Guibal (1699–1757). Because of these gates, Nancy is nicknamed City with Golden Gates (Ville aux Portes d'Or).

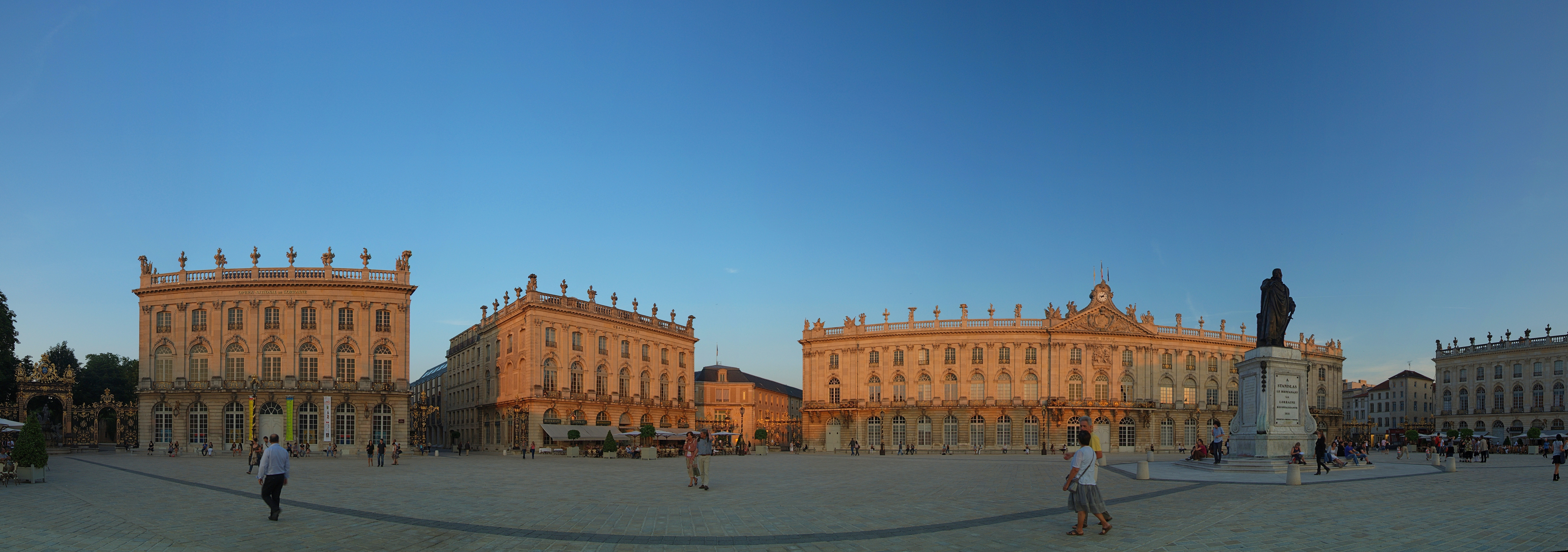
Panorama of the Place Stanislas after a renovation in 2010

=== Central statue ===
The statue in the centre of the Place Stanislas, created by Georges Jacquot, represents Stanislas standing, dressed in flowing robes, holding a sword in his left hand and pointing towards the north with his right hand. The inscriptions on the high marble pedestal read:

• South face:	Stanislas Leszczynski, Roi de Pologne, Duc de Lorraine et de Bar, 1737–1766
	(Stanislas Leszczynski, King of Poland, Duke of Lorraine and Bar, 1737–1766)
• North face:	À Stanislas le Bienfaisant, la Lorraine Reconnaissante, 1831, Meurthe-Meuse-Vosges
	(To Stanislas the Benefactor, Lorraine [is] grateful, 1831, Meurthe-Meuse-Vosges)

=== Hôtel de Ville ===
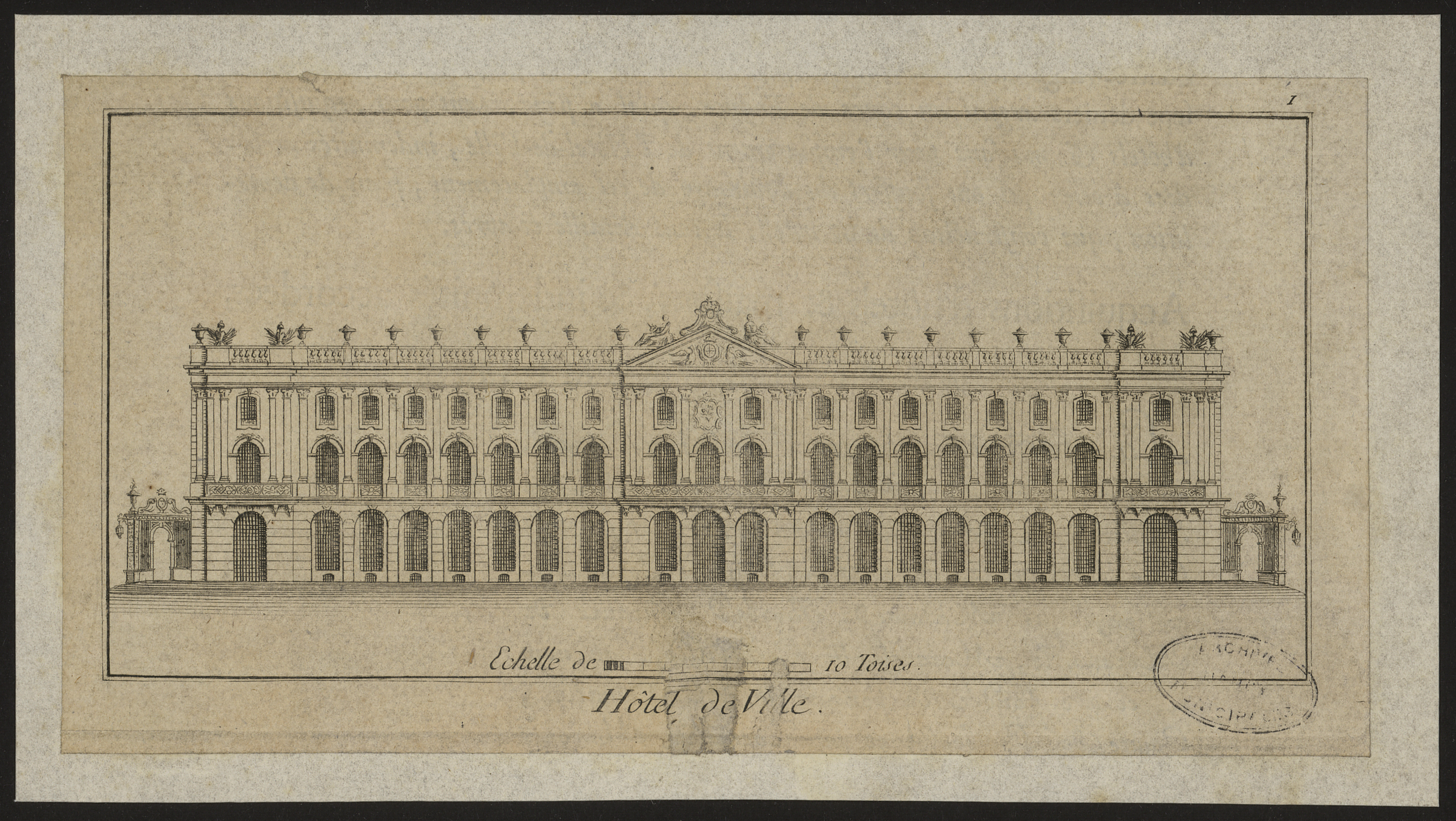
Plan of the façade of the Hôtel de Ville, presented by Emmanuel Héré

The Hôtel de Ville (City Hall), also known as Palais de Stanislas (Stanislas's Palace), is the largest building in the square at 98 metres long, and occupies the whole south side of the square. Built in 1752–1755, it has served as the city hall since its construction. It was designated as a monument historique on 12 July 1886.

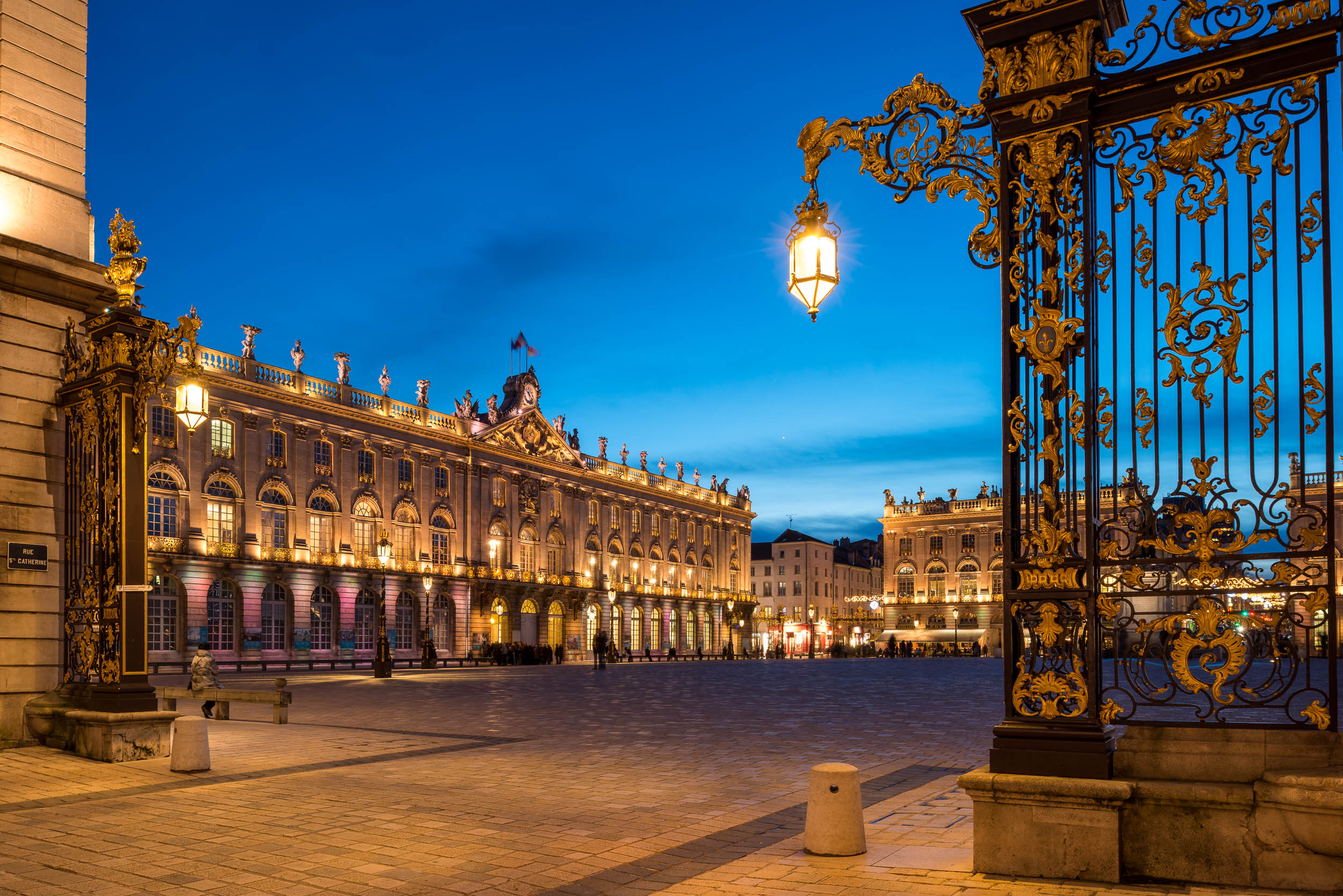
Golden gate in the Place Stanislas

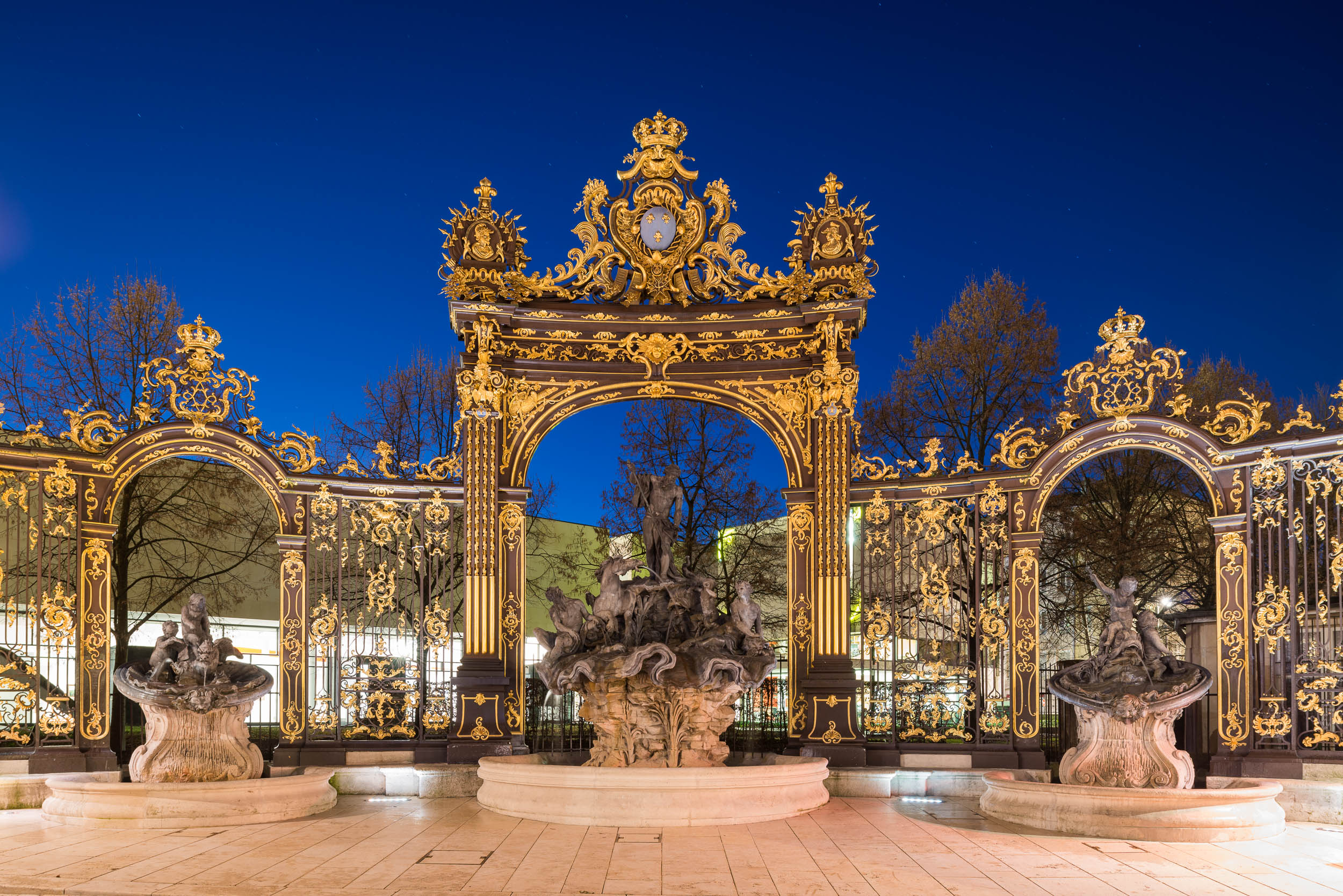
Fountain of Neptun

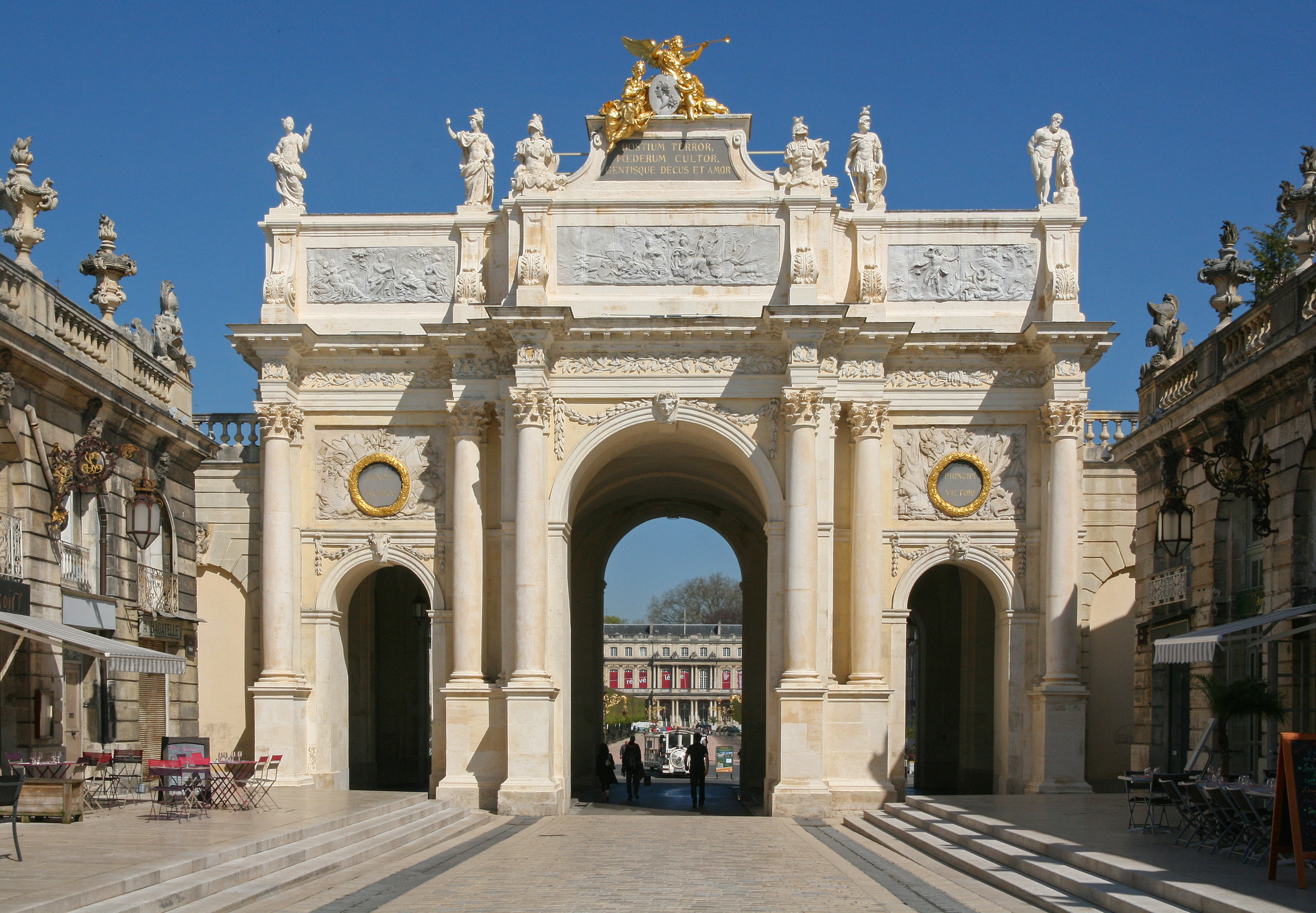
The Arc Héré ("Héré Arch")

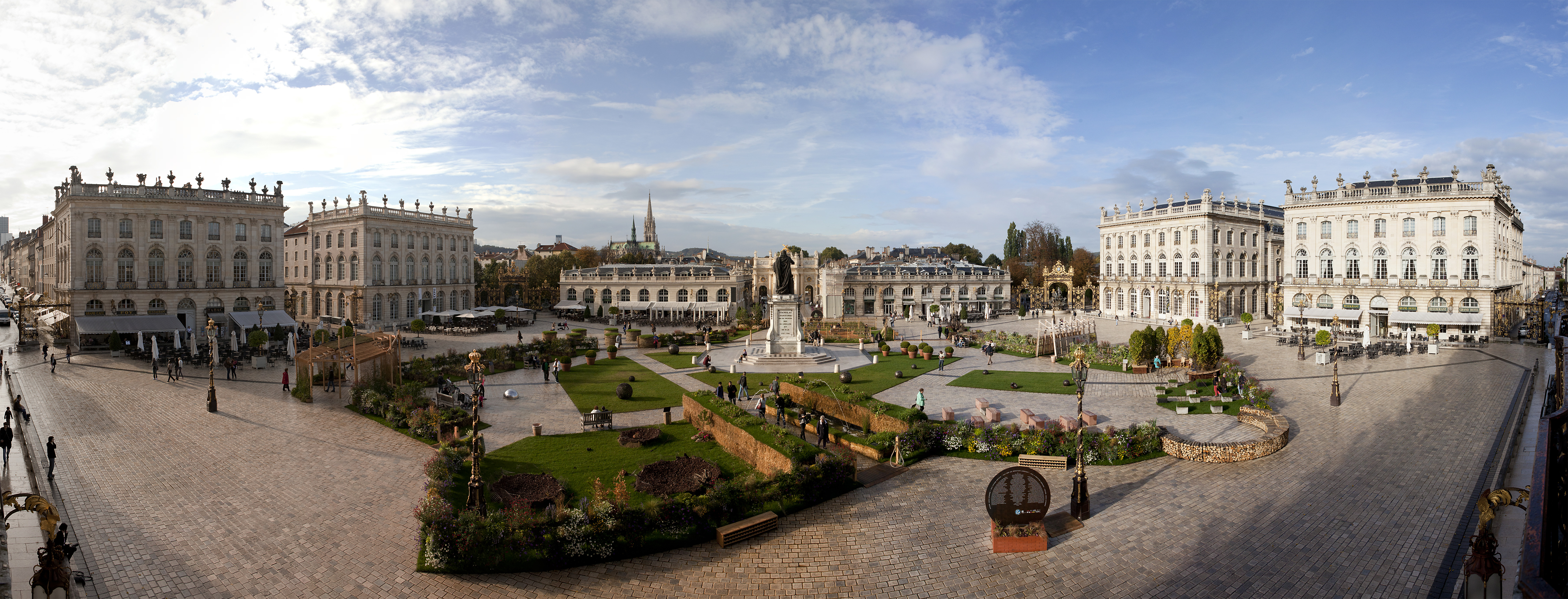
Panorama of the Place Stanislas in 2014

== See also ==
- List of World Heritage Sites in Europe
