= Georges Jacquot =

French sculptor (1794–1874)

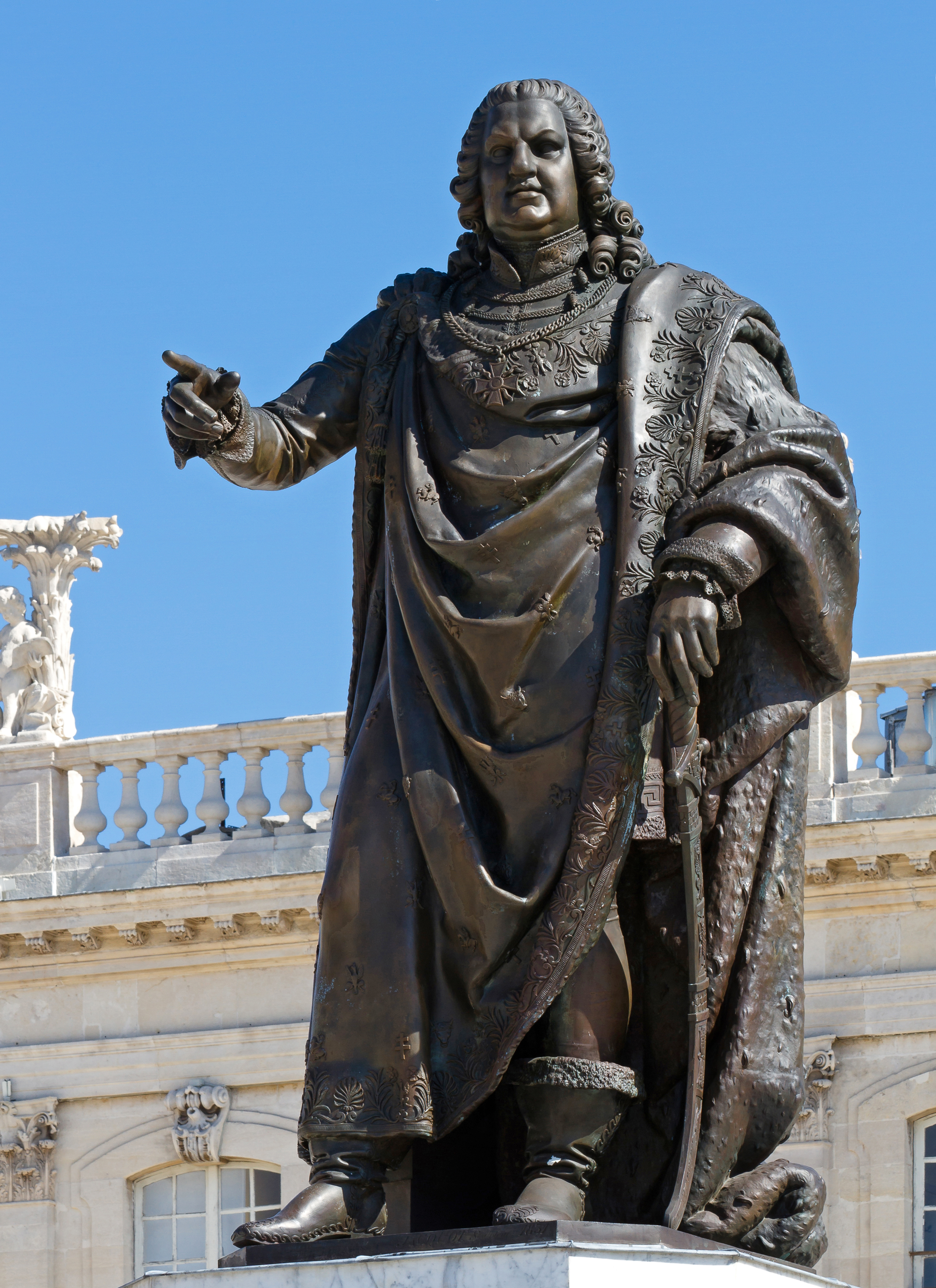
Stanislas Ist, 1831, statue, bronze, Nancy

Georges Jacquot (English: /ʒɑːˈkoʊ/ zhah-KOH, French: [ʒɔʁʒ ʒako]; 1794–1874) was a French sculptor.

== Biography ==
Born in Nancy, France in 1794, he was a pupil of Baron Gros and sculptor François Joseph Bosio. In 1820, he won the Grand Prix de Rome for sculpture with a statue named Caïn maudit, entendant la voix de l'Éternel. He died in 1874 in Paris.

== Bibliography ==
- Jeune nymphe descendant dans l'eau, marble, statue, Paris, musée du Louvre
- Cariatide, Paris, palais du Louvre, pavillon Denon
- Jeune triton chevauchant sur un dauphin, group, bronze, Paris, fontaine Gaillon, place Gaillon
- Stanislas Ist, 1831, statue, bronze, Nancy, place Stanislas
