= Emmanuel Héré de Corny =

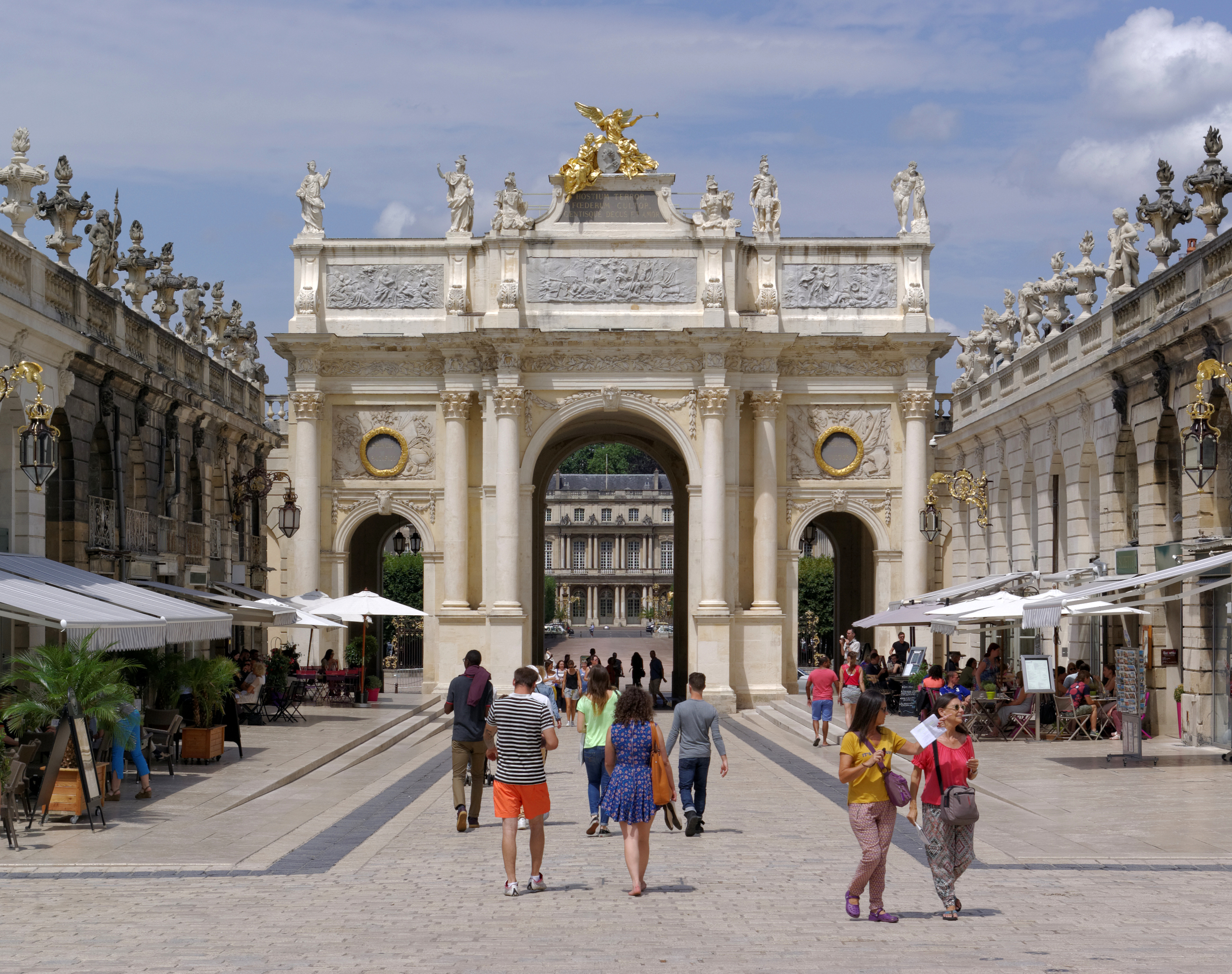
Héré's triumphal arch in Place Stanislas, Nancy, is based on the Arch of Septimius Severus, Rome

Emmanuel Héré de Corny (French pronunciation: [emanɥɛl eʁe də kɔʁni]; 12 October 1705 – burial: 2 February 1763) was the court architect to Stanisław Leszczyński, Duke of Lorraine and former King of Poland at his capital of Nancy.

Corny, who was born in Nancy, is famous for the harmonious suite of axial spaces he developed, extending from the Place Stanislas to the Palais du Gouvernement; the sequence is a prime example of eighteenth-century urbanism.

He died, aged 57, in Lunéville.
