= Nancy, France =

City in Grand Est, France

Nancy
- Prefecture and commune
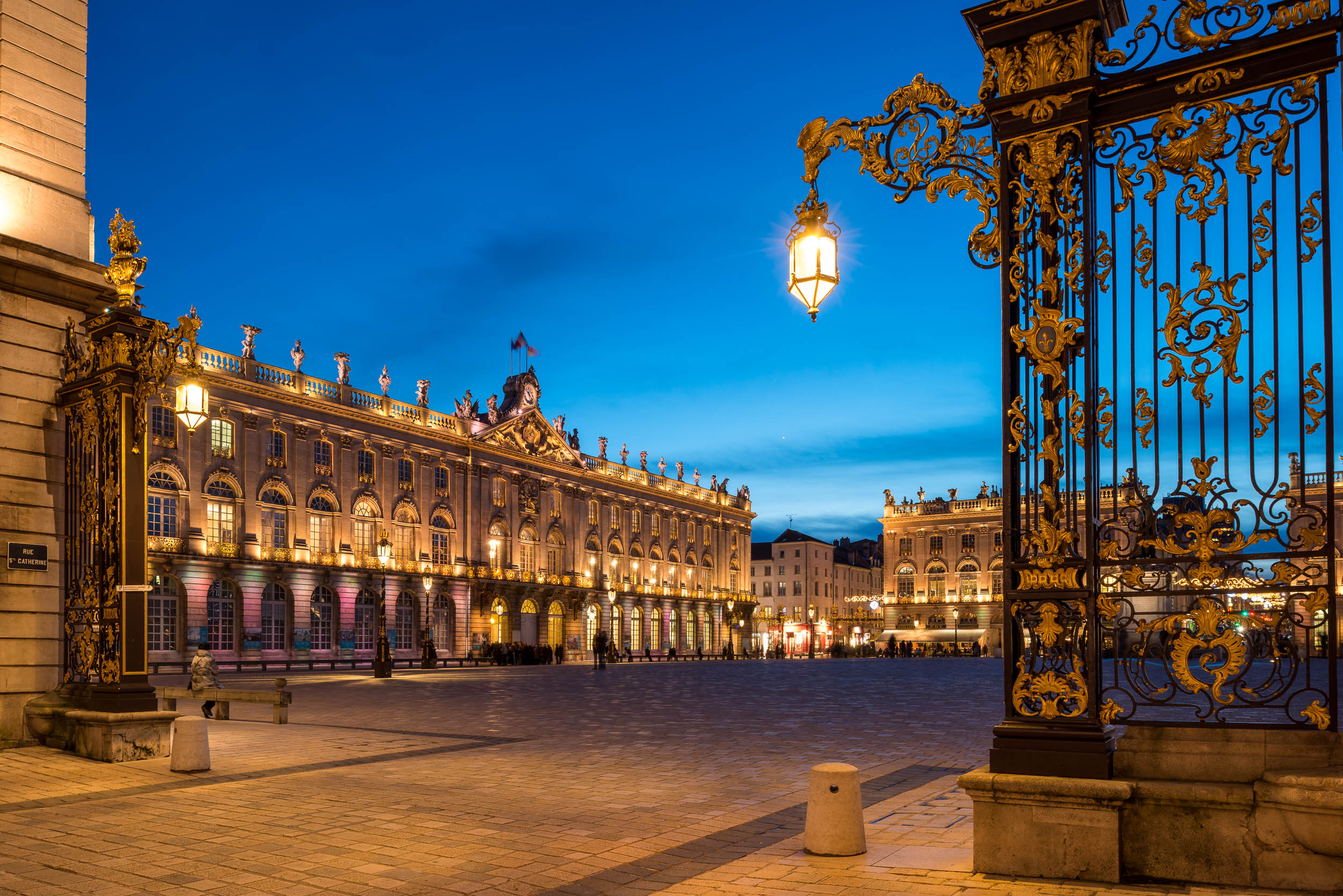
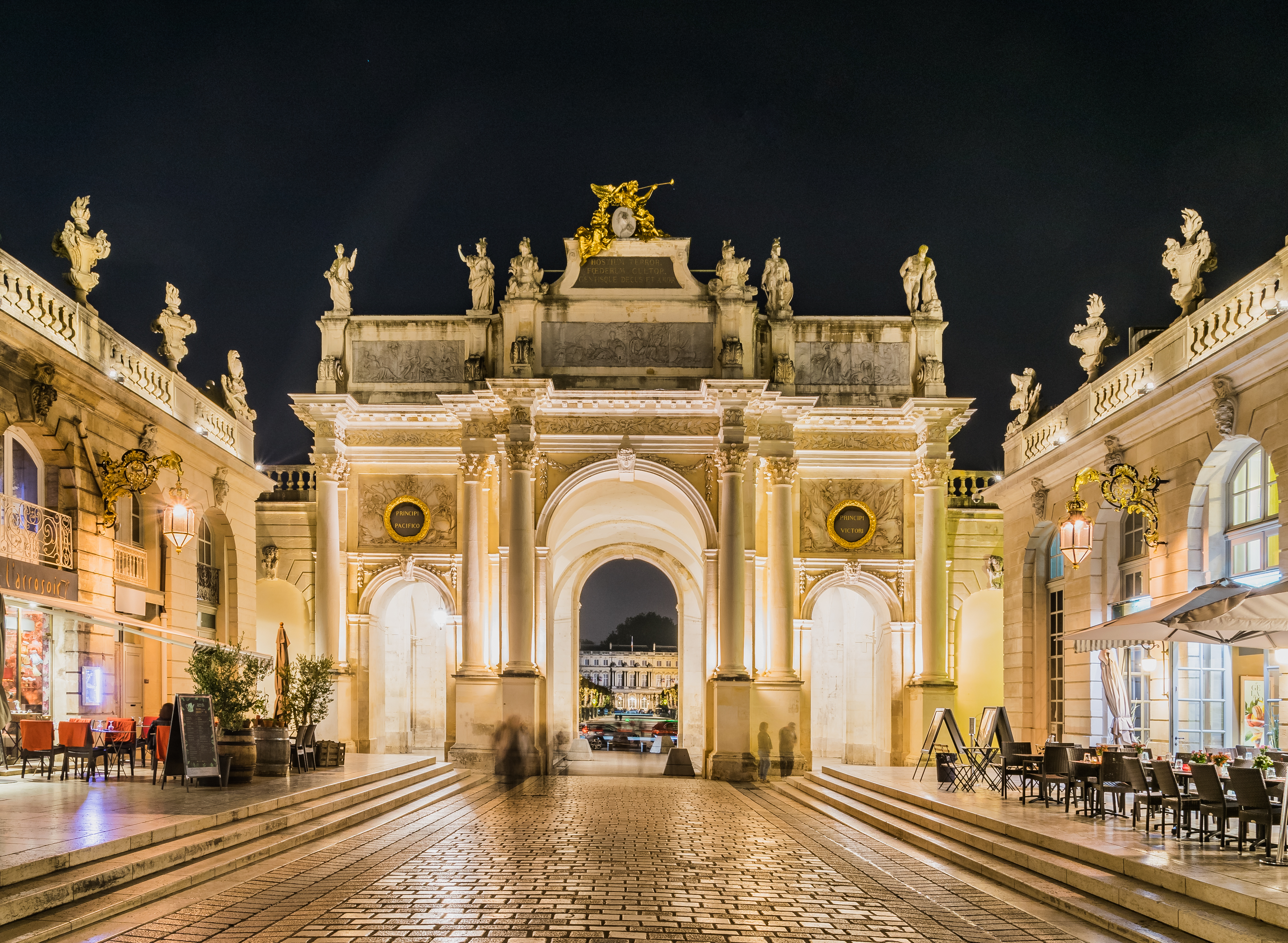
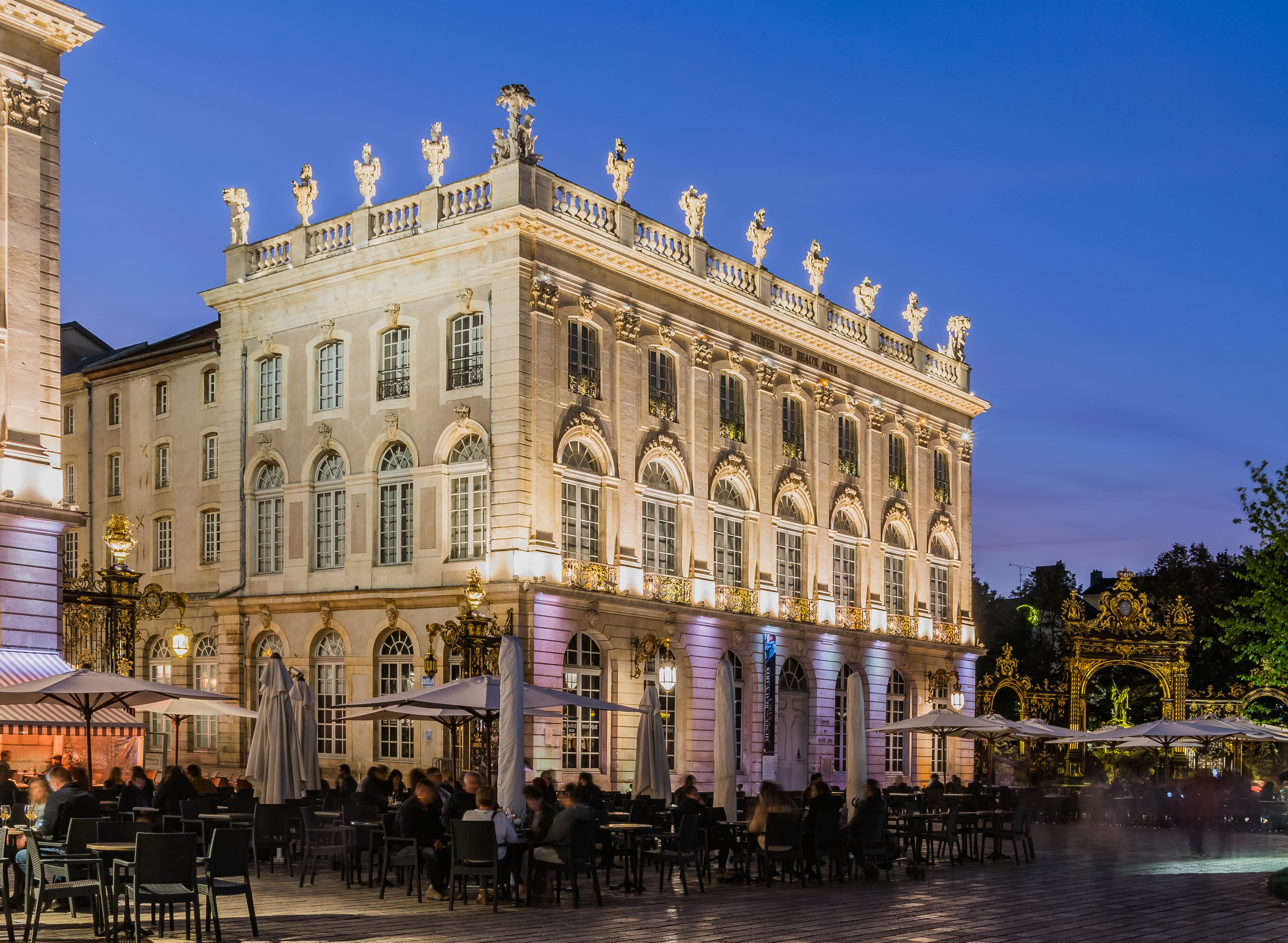
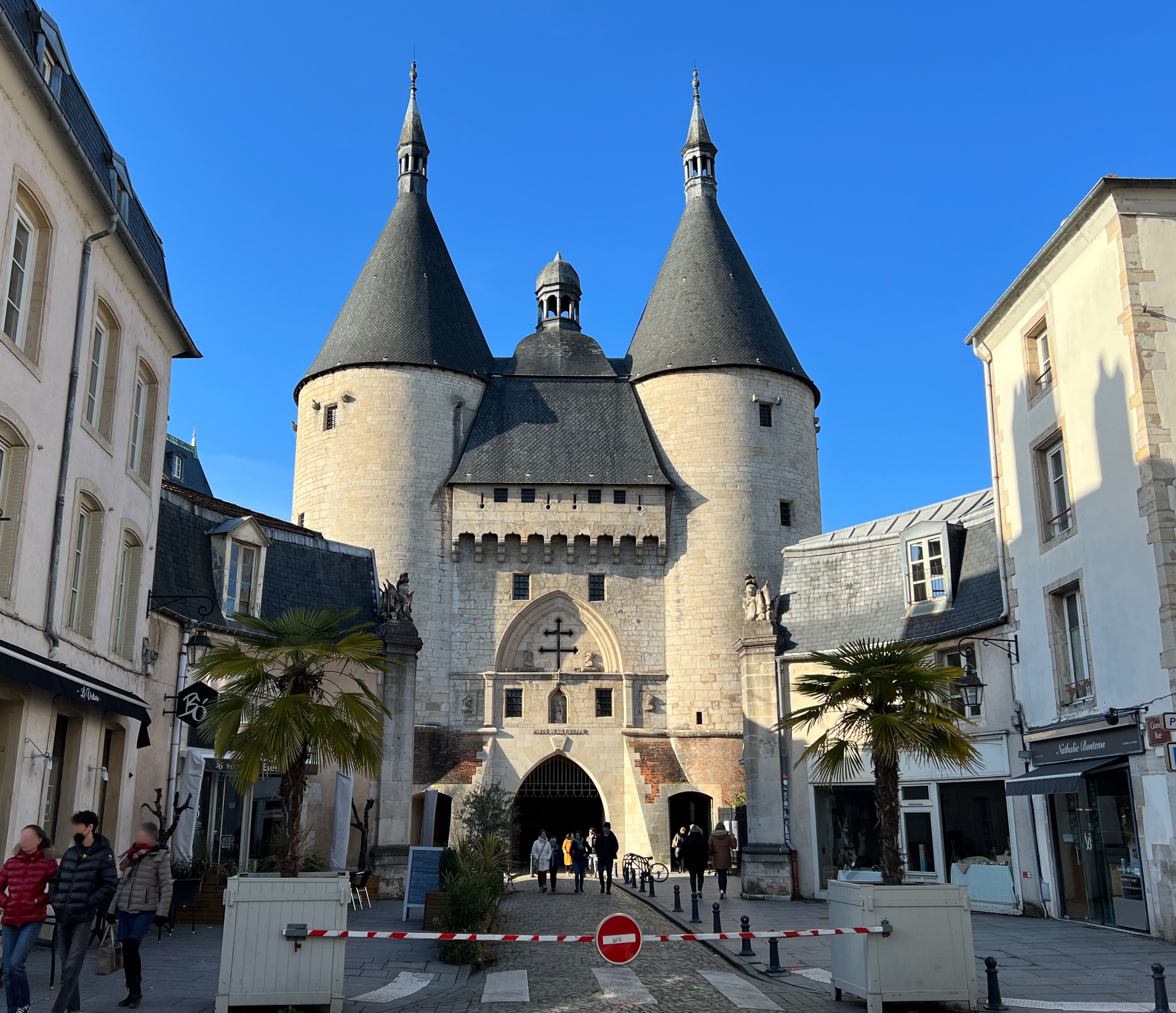
- From top to bottom, left to right: The Hôtel de Ville within the Place Stanislas; Museum of Fine Arts of Nancy; Arc Héré; and Porte de la Craffe

- Coat of arms
- Motto(s): Non inultus premor (Latin for 'I am not injured unavenged')
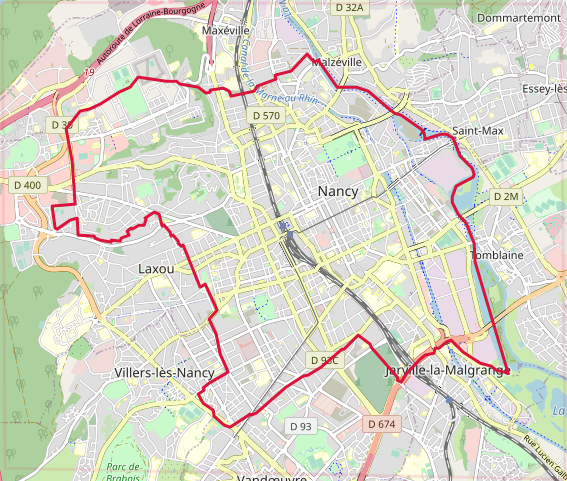
- Location of Nancy
- Location within France Location within Grand Est
- Coordinates: 48°41′37″N 6°11′05″E
- Country: France
- Region: Grand Est
- Department: Meurthe-et-Moselle
- Arrondissement: Nancy
- Canton: 3 cantons
- Intercommunality: Métropole du Grand Nancy

Government
  - Mayor (2026–32): Mathieu Klein (PS)
- Area^{1}: 15.01 km^{2} (5.80 sq mi)
- Elevation: 212 m (696 ft)
- Highest elevation: 353 m (1,158 ft)
- Lowest elevation: 188 m (617 ft)
- Population (2023): 103,671
  - Density: 6,907/km^{2} (17,890/sq mi)
- Demonym(s): Nancéien (masculine); Nancéienne (feminine)
- Time zone: UTC+01:00 (CET)
  - Summer (DST): UTC+02:00 (CEST)
- INSEE/Postal code: 54395 /54000
- Website: http://www.nancy.fr/
- ^{1} French Land Register data, which excludes lakes, ponds, glaciers > 1 km^{2} (0.386 sq mi or 247 acres) and river estuaries.

Nancy (Note: /ˈnænsi/ NAN-see, UK also /ˈnɒ̃si/, US also /nɒ̃ˈsiː, ˈnɑːnsi/ NAHN-see; French: [nɑ̃si]; German: Nanzig [ˈnantsɪç]; Luxembourgish: Nanzeg [ˈnɑntsəɕ]; Lorraine Franconian: Nanzisch.) is the prefecture of the northeastern French department of Meurthe-et-Moselle, located in the Grand Est region (in the historical region of Lorraine). The city is situated on the left bank of the Meurthe. The metropolitan area of Nancy had a population of 508,793 inhabitants as of 2021, making it the 16th-largest functional urban area in France and the largest in Lorraine. The population of the city of Nancy proper is 104,387 (2022).

The origins of the city date back to the 11th century, when a fortified town was established by Gerard, Duke of Lorraine. Nancy developed into the ducal seat of the Duchy of Lorraine, a position it held until the duchy was annexed by France under King Louis XV in 1766 and replaced by a province, with Nancy maintained as capital. The city's Old Town (Vieille Ville), centred around the Ducal Palace of Nancy, reflects this long history, while the 18th century Ville-Neuve bears witness to a period of ambitious urban planning under Stanislaus I of Poland. His patronage produced some of the city's most notable monuments, including the Place Stanislas, a large square built between 1752 and 1756 by architect Emmanuel Héré, today inscribed on the UNESCO World Heritage List.

Following its rise to prominence in the Age of Enlightenment, it was nicknamed the "capital of Eastern France" in the late 19th century. Nancy became an important industrial and cultural hub in the 19th and early 20th centuries, especially during the Art Nouveau period. The École de Nancy, a collective of artists and architects led by figures such as Émile Gallé and Victor Prouvé, made the city a centre of innovation in decorative arts and design. Its legacy is still visible today in numerous buildings, glassworks, and collections.

In the present day, Nancy is a regional centre for culture, science, and education. It hosts the University of Lorraine, one of the largest French universities. With the Centre Hospitalier Régional Universitaire de Brabois, the conurbation is home to one of the main health centres in Europe, renowned for its innovations in surgical robotics. Notable cultural institutions include the Musée des Beaux-Arts de Nancy and the Opéra national de Lorraine. The motto of the city is Non inultus premor (Latin for 'I am not injured unavenged') — a reference to the thistle, which is a symbol of Lorraine.

== History ==
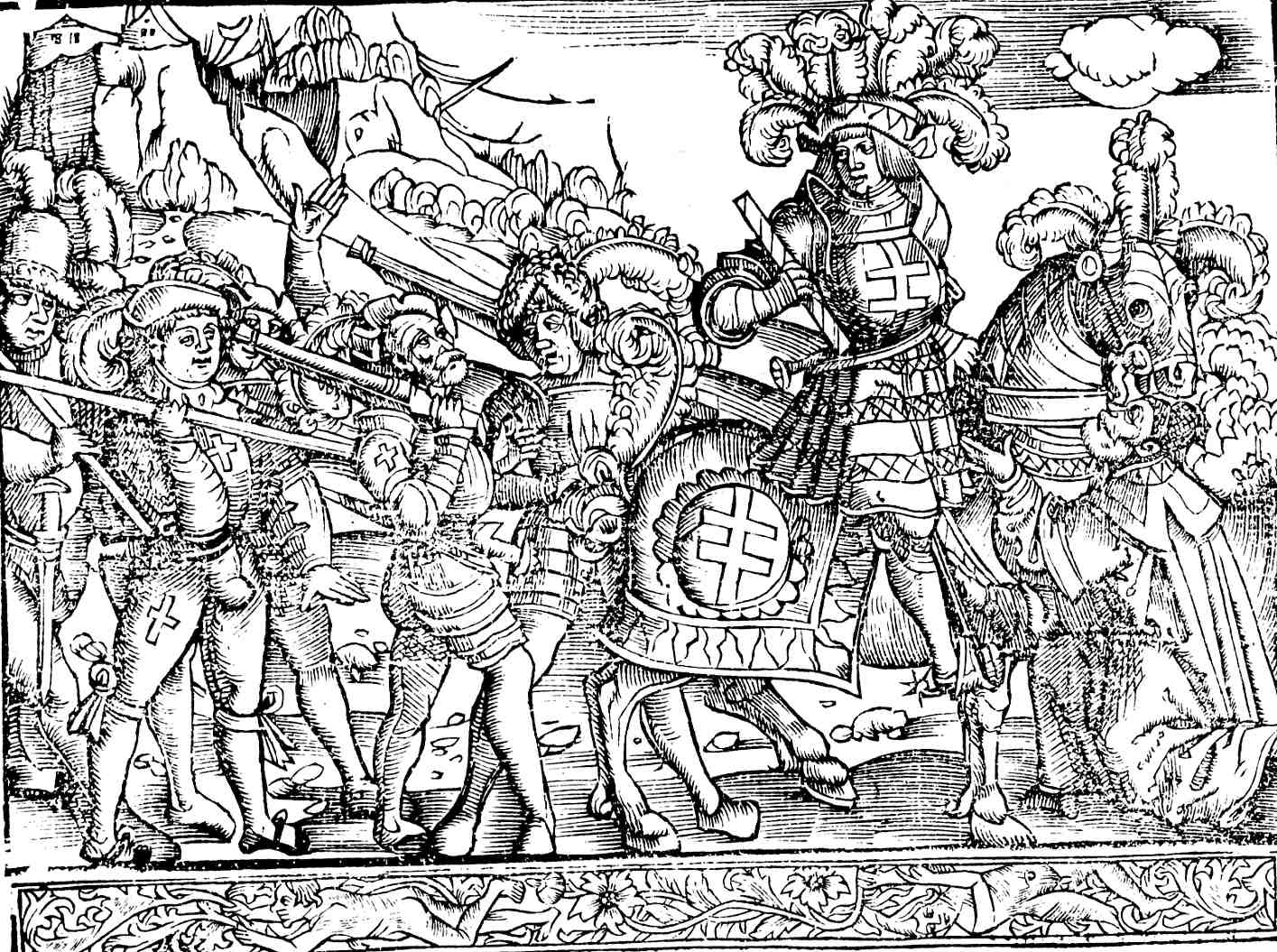
Engraving depicting the capture of Nancy through Duke René II of Lorraine in 1477

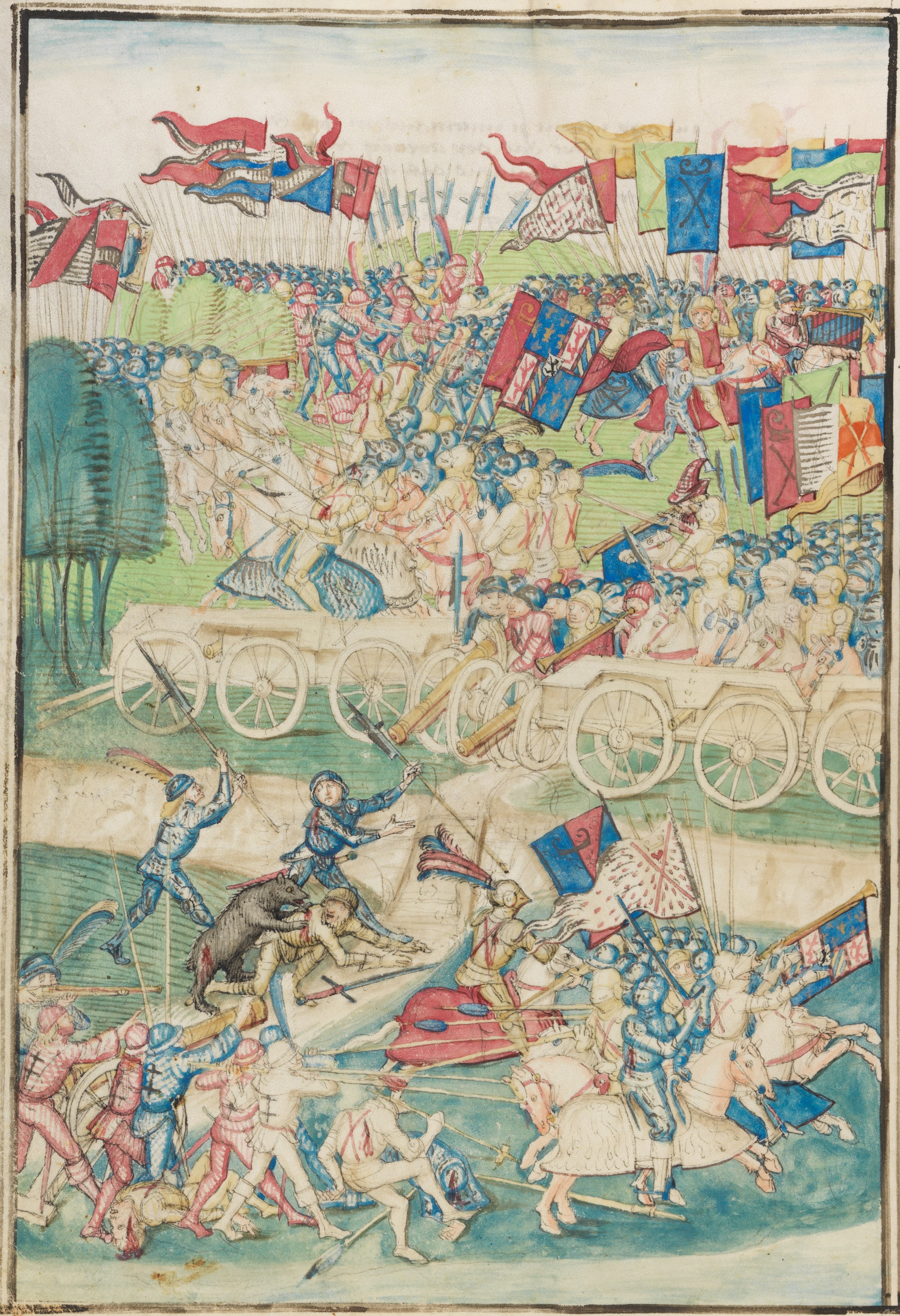
1477 Battle of Nancy

The earliest signs of human settlement in the area date to 800 BC. Early settlers were likely attracted by easily mined iron ore and a ford in the river Meurthe. Its name is first attested as Nanciaco, possibly from a Gaulish personal name. A small fortified town named Nanciacum (Nancy) was built by Gérard, Duke of Lorraine around 1050.

Nancy was burned in 1218 at the end of the War of Succession of Champagne, and conquered by Emperor Frederick II. It was rebuilt in stone over the next few centuries as it grew in importance as the capital of the Duchy of Lorraine. Duke Charles the Bold of Burgundy was defeated and killed in the Battle of Nancy in 1477; René II, Duke of Lorraine became the ruler.

Following the failure of both Emperor Joseph I and Emperor Charles VI to produce a son and heir, the Pragmatic Sanction of 1713 left the throne to the latter's next child. This turned out to be a daughter, Maria Theresa of Austria. In 1736, Emperor Charles arranged her marriage to Duke François of Lorraine, who reluctantly agreed to exchange his ancestral lands for the Grand Duchy of Tuscany.

The exiled Polish king Stanislaus (Stanisław Leszczyński in Polish), father-in-law of the French king Louis XV, was then given the vacant duchy of Lorraine. Under his nominal rule, Nancy experienced growth and a flowering of Baroque culture and architecture. Stanislaus oversaw the construction of Place Stanislaus, a major square and development connecting the old medieval with a newer part of the city. On the south side of the Place Stanislaus is the Hôtel de Ville, which was completed in 1755. Upon Stanislaus' death in February 1766, Lorraine and Barrois became a regular government of the Kingdom of France. A parlement for Lorraine and Barrois was established in Nancy in 1776.

As unrest surfaced within the French Armed Forces during the French Revolution, a full-scale mutiny, known as the Nancy affair, took place in Nancy in the latter part of summer 1790. A few units loyal to the government laid siege to the town and shot or imprisoned the mutineers.

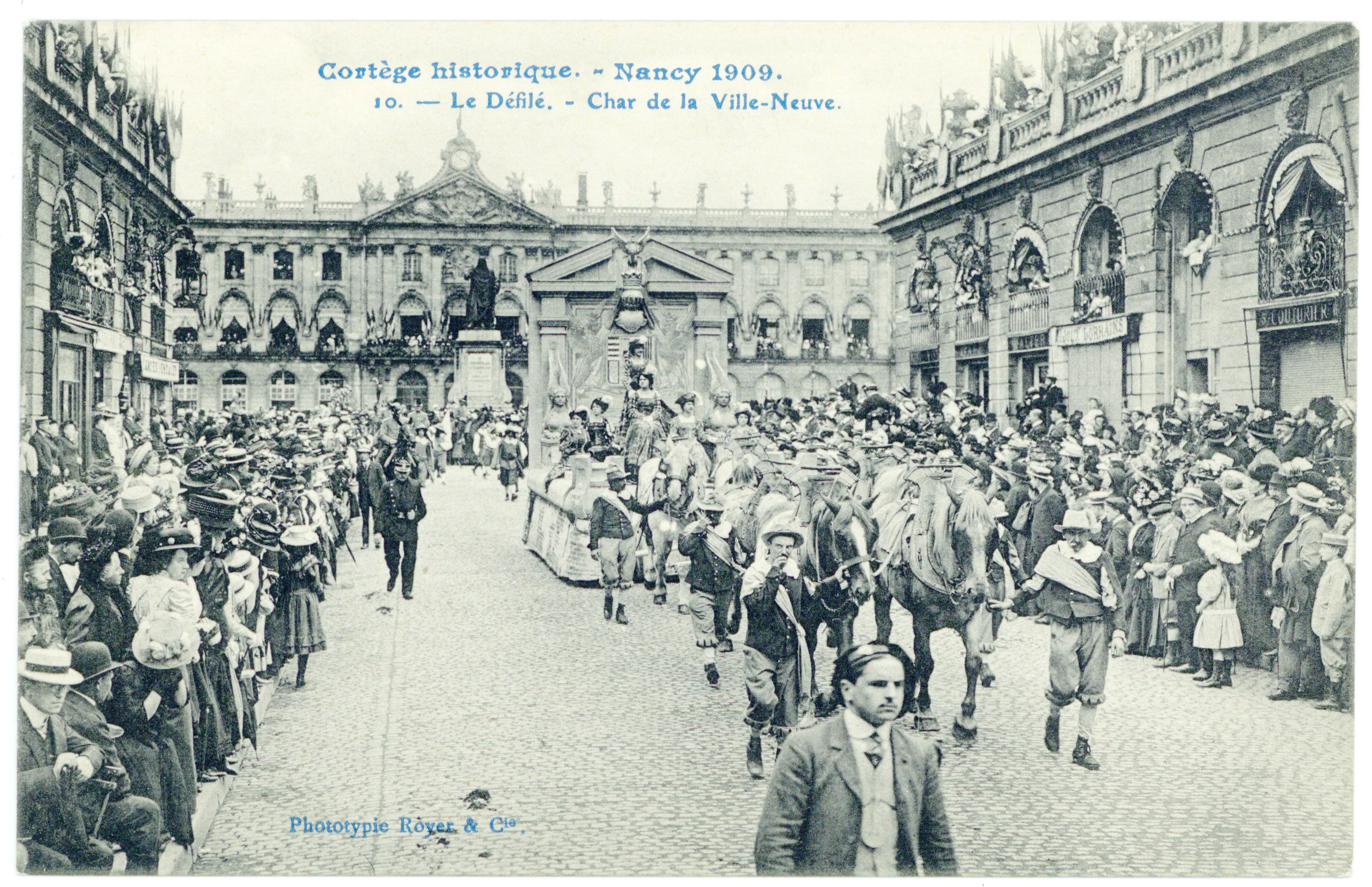
Parade in 1909

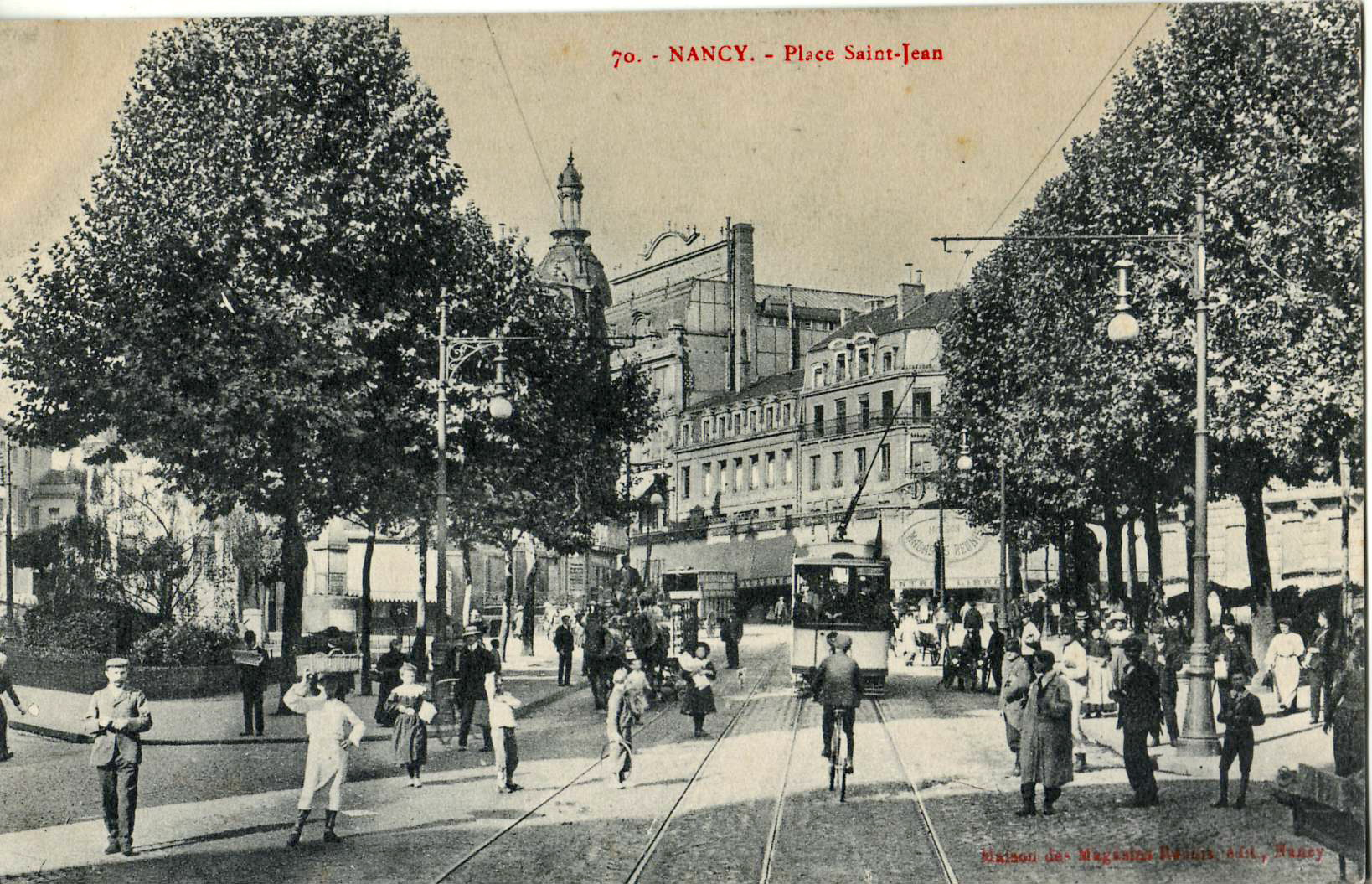
Nancy c. 1914

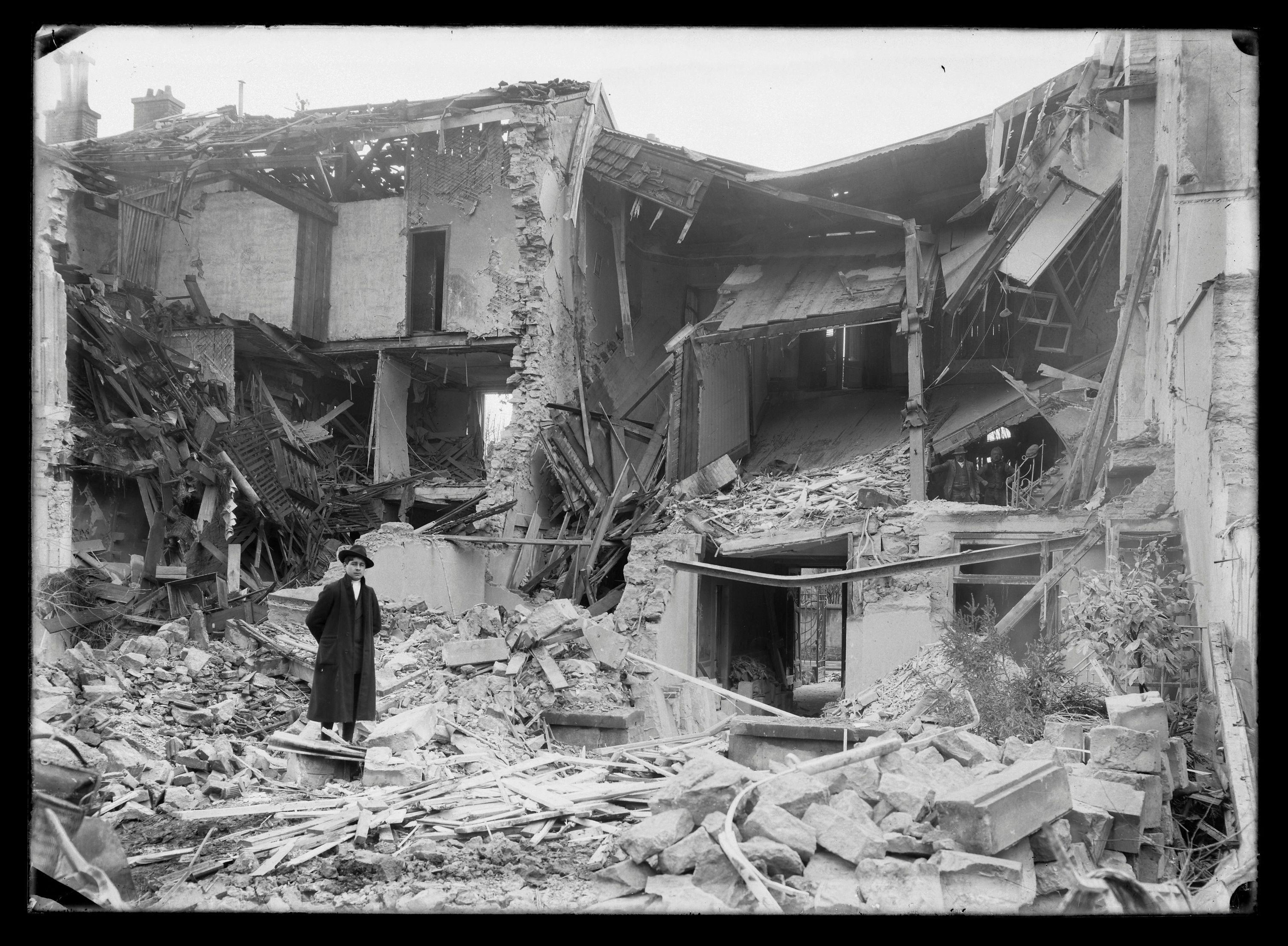
Nancy in World War I

In 1871, Nancy remained French when Germany annexed Alsace-Lorraine. In 1909, it hosted the Exposition Internationale de l'Est de la France between May and November.

Nancy was occupied by German forces beginning in 1940 and renamed Nanzig. During the Lorraine Campaign of World War II, Nancy was liberated from Nazi Germany by the US Third Army in September 1944, at the Battle of Nancy.

In 1988, Pope John Paul II visited Nancy. In 2005, French President Jacques Chirac, German Chancellor Gerhard Schröder and Polish President Aleksander Kwaśniewski inaugurated the renovated Place Stanislas, which was recognised as a UNESCO World Heritage Site in 1983.

== Geography ==
Nancy is situated on the left bank of the river Meurthe, about 10 km upstream from its confluence with the Moselle. The Marne–Rhine Canal runs through the city, parallel to the Meurthe. Nancy is surrounded by hills that are about 150 m higher than the city centre, which is situated at 200 m above mean sea level. The area of Nancy proper is relatively small: 15 km^{2}. Its built-up area is continuous with those of its adjacent suburbs. The neighboring communes of Nancy are: Jarville-la-Malgrange, Laxou, Malzéville, Maxéville, Saint-Max, Tomblaine, Vandœuvre-lès-Nancy and Villers-lès-Nancy.

The oldest part of Nancy is the quarter Vieille Ville – Léopold, which contains the 14th century Porte de la Craffe, the Palace of the Dukes of Lorraine, the Porte Désilles and the 19th century St-Epvre basilica. Adjacent to its south is the quarter Charles III – Centre Ville, which is the 16th–18th century "new town". This quarter contains the famous Place Stanislas, the Nancy Cathedral, the Opéra national de Lorraine and the main railway station.

The population of the city proper experienced a small decrease in population since 2007, placing it behind Metz as the second largest city in the Lorraine. However, the urban area of Metz experienced population decline from 1990 to 2010 while the urban area of Nancy grew over the same period, becoming the largest urban area in Lorraine and second largest in the "Grand Est" region of northeastern France. Within the Nancy metropolitan area in recent years, the city population declined slightly (2009–2014), while there was a small increase in the population of its urban area (2006–2012).

=== Climate ===
Nancy has an oceanic climate (Köppen: Cfb), although a bit more extreme than most of the larger French cities. By the standards of France it is a "continental" climate with a certain degree of maritime (unrelated to the Köppen classification, since generally the whole country has a predominant mechanism favored by the West winds).

The temperatures have a distinct variation of the temperate zone, both during the day and between seasons but without being very different. Winters are cold and dry in freezing climates. Summers are not always sunny, but warm enough. Mists are frequent in autumn and the winds are light and not too violent. Precipitation tends to be less abundant than in the west of the country. Sunshine hours are almost identical to Paris and the snowy days are the same as Strasbourg (most similar weather conditions). Although the lowest recorded temperature is officially −26.8 °C, some sources consider temperatures from −30 °C on 10 December 1879 before continuous data.

Comparison of local Meteorological data with other cities in France
Town	Sunshine (hours/yr)	Rain (mm/yr)	Snow (days/yr)	Storm (days/yr)	Fog (days/yr)
National average	1,973	770	14	22	40
Nancy	1,666	775.1	29.6	27.6	49.6
Paris	1,661	637	12	18	10
Nice	2,724	767	1	29	1
Strasbourg	1,693	665	29	29	56
Brest	1,605	1,211	7	12	75

Climate data for Nancy - Essey (ENC), elevation: 212 m (696 ft) (1991-2020 normals, extremes 1927-present)
Month	Jan	Feb	Mar	Apr	May	Jun	Jul	Aug	Sep	Oct	Nov	Dec	Year
Record high °C (°F)	16.8 (62.2)	20.8 (69.4)	26.0 (78.8)	29.3 (84.7)	33.0 (91.4)	37.2 (99.0)	40.1 (104.2)	39.3 (102.7)	34.4 (93.9)	27.6 (81.7)	22.7 (72.9)	18.5 (65.3)	40.1 (104.2)
Mean daily maximum °C (°F)	5.4 (41.7)	7.1 (44.8)	11.6 (52.9)	15.8 (60.4)	19.8 (67.6)	23.5 (74.3)	25.8 (78.4)	25.4 (77.7)	20.9 (69.6)	15.5 (59.9)	9.4 (48.9)	6.0 (42.8)	15.5 (59.9)
Daily mean °C (°F)	2.6 (36.7)	3.5 (38.3)	6.9 (44.4)	10.2 (50.4)	14.2 (57.6)	17.9 (64.2)	20.0 (68.0)	19.6 (67.3)	15.6 (60.1)	11.3 (52.3)	6.4 (43.5)	3.5 (38.3)	11.0 (51.8)
Mean daily minimum °C (°F)	−0.2 (31.6)	0.0 (32.0)	2.1 (35.8)	4.5 (40.1)	8.7 (47.7)	12.2 (54.0)	14.2 (57.6)	13.9 (57.0)	10.2 (50.4)	7.1 (44.8)	3.4 (38.1)	1.0 (33.8)	6.4 (43.5)
Record low °C (°F)	−21.6 (−6.9)	−24.8 (−12.6)	−15.9 (3.4)	−6.8 (19.8)	−4.2 (24.4)	1.6 (34.9)	2.0 (35.6)	2.8 (37.0)	−1.3 (29.7)	−7.9 (17.8)	−12.7 (9.1)	−21.3 (−6.3)	−24.8 (−12.6)
Average precipitation mm (inches)	64.4 (2.54)	54.8 (2.16)	54.1 (2.13)	44.3 (1.74)	67.9 (2.67)	56.0 (2.20)	63.0 (2.48)	67.2 (2.65)	61.1 (2.41)	66.5 (2.62)	68.9 (2.71)	78.1 (3.07)	746.3 (29.38)
Average precipitation days (≥ 1.0mm)	11.1	9.8	9.4	8.5	10.1	9.1	9.5	9.0	9.0	10.8	11.4	12.6	120.2
Average snowy days	8.0	6.7	4.5	1.8	0.1	0.0	0.0	0.0	0.0	0.1	3.4	6.1	30.7
Average relative humidity (%)	87	83	78	74	75	75	75	77	81	86	87	87	80
Mean monthly sunshine hours	52.4	80.1	139.6	181.2	205.6	223.5	234.8	219.4	171.9	104.6	52.1	43.2	1,708.3
Source 1: Meteociel
Source 2: Infoclimat.fr (humidity and snowy days 1961-1990)

Climate data for Nancy-Ochey (Les Ensanges, altitude 336m, 1991–2020 normals, extremes 1966–present)
Month	Jan	Feb	Mar	Apr	May	Jun	Jul	Aug	Sep	Oct	Nov	Dec	Year
Record high °C (°F)	16.0 (60.8)	21.2 (70.2)	25.7 (78.3)	27.3 (81.1)	32.2 (90.0)	36.6 (97.9)	39.6 (103.3)	38.4 (101.1)	34.2 (93.6)	26.0 (78.8)	22.0 (71.6)	18.4 (65.1)	39.6 (103.3)
Mean daily maximum °C (°F)	4.6 (40.3)	6.2 (43.2)	10.7 (51.3)	14.9 (58.8)	18.8 (65.8)	22.5 (72.5)	24.8 (76.6)	24.5 (76.1)	19.9 (67.8)	14.6 (58.3)	8.7 (47.7)	5.3 (41.5)	14.6 (58.3)
Daily mean °C (°F)	2.1 (35.8)	3.1 (37.6)	6.5 (43.7)	9.9 (49.8)	13.7 (56.7)	17.2 (63.0)	19.3 (66.7)	19.1 (66.4)	15.0 (59.0)	10.9 (51.6)	6.0 (42.8)	3.0 (37.4)	10.5 (50.9)
Mean daily minimum °C (°F)	−0.4 (31.3)	−0.1 (31.8)	2.2 (36.0)	4.9 (40.8)	8.6 (47.5)	11.8 (53.2)	13.8 (56.8)	13.7 (56.7)	10.2 (50.4)	7.2 (45.0)	3.3 (37.9)	0.7 (33.3)	6.3 (43.3)
Record low °C (°F)	−19.1 (−2.4)	−16.2 (2.8)	−15.5 (4.1)	−7.2 (19.0)	−1.6 (29.1)	0.8 (33.4)	4.5 (40.1)	4.0 (39.2)	−0.3 (31.5)	−4.7 (23.5)	−13.2 (8.2)	−15.8 (3.6)	−19.1 (−2.4)
Average precipitation mm (inches)	66.7 (2.63)	60.1 (2.37)	58.8 (2.31)	50.5 (1.99)	74.0 (2.91)	62.0 (2.44)	68.8 (2.71)	71.7 (2.82)	66.9 (2.63)	72.6 (2.86)	75.5 (2.97)	82.8 (3.26)	810.4 (31.91)
Average precipitation days (≥ 1.0 mm)	11.6	10.4	10.0	9.1	10.3	9.6	9.5	9.4	9.2	11.4	12.1	12.5	125.1
Average snowy days	6.9	7.1	4.6	1.7	0.1	0.0	0.0	0.0	0.0	0.1	2.5	5.9	28.9
Source: Météo-France, Meteociel.fr (snowy days 1981-2010)

== Demographics ==
Historical population

Year	Pop.	±% p.a.
1793	29,141	—
1800	28,227	−0.45%
1806	30,532	+1.32%
1821	29,241	−0.29%
1831	29,122	−0.04%
1836	31,445	+1.55%
1841	35,901	+2.69%
1846	38,795	+1.56%
1851	40,289	+0.76%
1856	48,199	+3.65%
1861	49,305	+0.45%
1872	52,978	+0.66%
1876	66,303	+5.77%
1881	73,225	+2.01%
1886	79,038	+1.54%
1891	87,110	+1.96%
1896	96,306	+2.03%
1901	102,559	+1.27%

Year	Pop.	±% p.a.
1906	110,570	+1.52%
1911	119,949	+1.64%
1921	113,226	−0.58%
1926	114,491	+0.22%
1931	120,578	+1.04%
1936	121,301	+0.12%
1946	113,477	−0.66%
1954	124,797	+1.20%
1962	128,677	+0.38%
1968	123,428	−0.69%
1975	107,902	−1.90%
1982	96,317	−1.61%
1990	99,351	+0.39%
1999	103,605	+0.47%
2007	105,349	+0.21%
2012	105,067	−0.05%
2017	104,286	−0.15%
2023	103,671	−0.10%

Source: EHESS and INSEE (1968-2023)

== Government ==
The most recent local election was the 2026 Nancy municipal election.

== Main sights ==
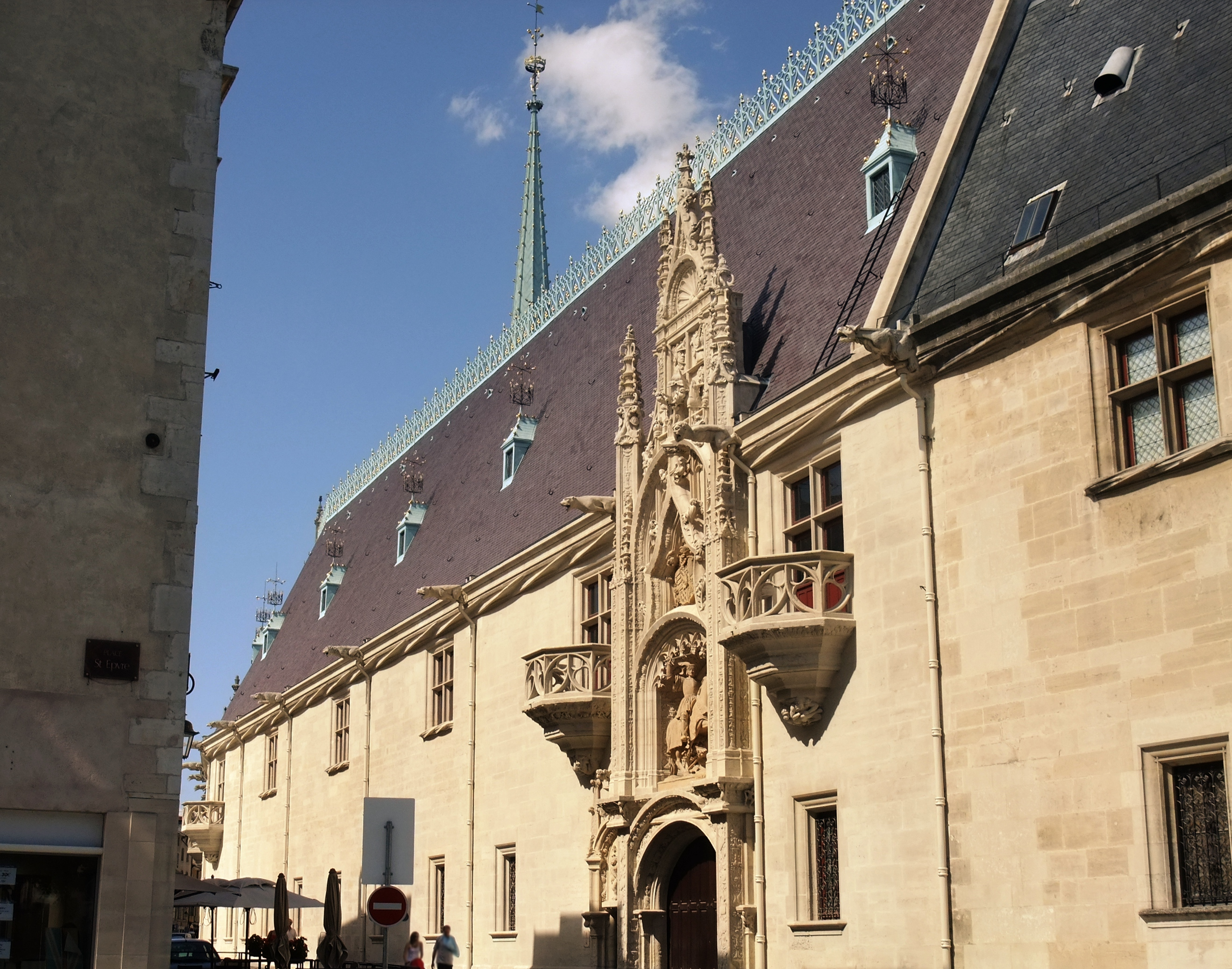
The Ducal Palace of Nancy

The old city centre’s heritage dates from the Middle Ages to the 18th century. The cathedral of Nancy, the Triumphal Arch and the "Place de la Carrière" are a fine examples of 18th-century architecture. The Palace of the Dukes of Lorraine is the former princely residence of the rulers. The palace houses the Musée Lorrain.

A historic church is the Church of Notre-Dame-de-Bonsecours, Nancy, final resting place of the last duke Stanislas. Other notable churches are the Church of Saint-François-des-Cordeliers and the Basilica of Saint-Epvre, which have historical ties to the ducal House of Lorraine.

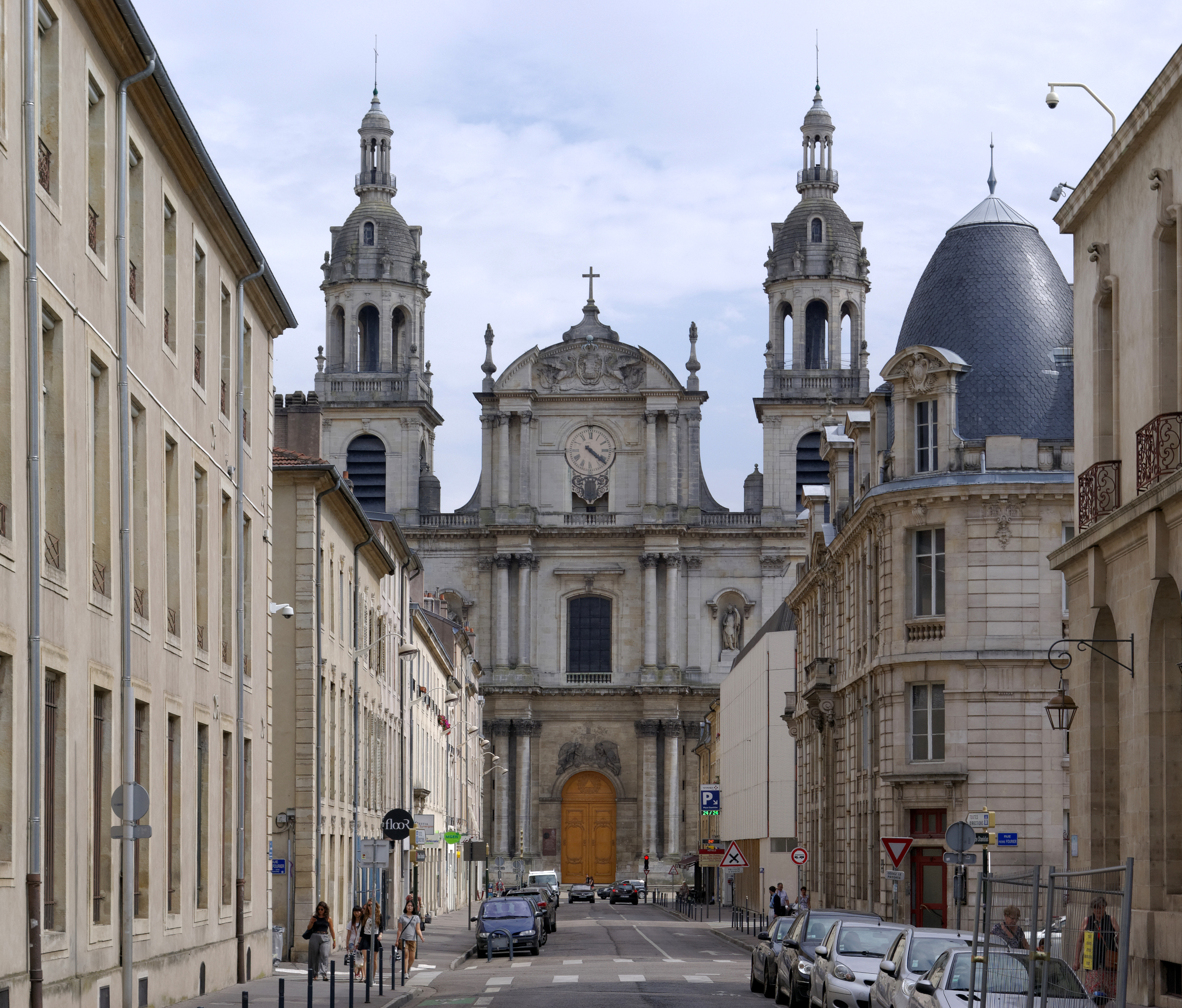
Notre-Dame Cathedral of Nancy

The Place Stanislas named after king of Poland and duke of Lorraine Stanislaus I, Place de la Carrière, and Place d'Alliance were added on the World Heritage Sites list by the UNESCO in 1983.

The "École de Nancy", a group of artists and architects founded by the glassmaster and furniture maker Émile Gallé, worked in the Art Nouveau style at the end of the 19th century and the early 20th century. It was principally their work which made Nancy a center of art and architecture that rivaled Paris and helped give the city the nickname "Capitale de l'Est". The city still possesses many Art Nouveau buildings (mostly banks or private homes). Furniture, glassware, and other pieces of the decorative arts are conserved at the Musée de l'École de Nancy, which is housed in the 1909 villa of Eugène Corbin, a Nancy businessman and supporter of the Art Nouveau there. The Musée des Beaux-Arts has further collections of the Art Nouveau movement.

A major botanical garden, the Jardin botanique du Montet, is located at Villers-lès-Nancy. Other gardens of interest include the city's earliest botanical garden, the Jardin Dominique Alexandre Godron, and various other public gardens and places of interest including the Pépinière and Parc Sainte-Marie (public gardens). The town also has an aquarium. The surroundings of the train station are a busy commercial area.

== Culture ==
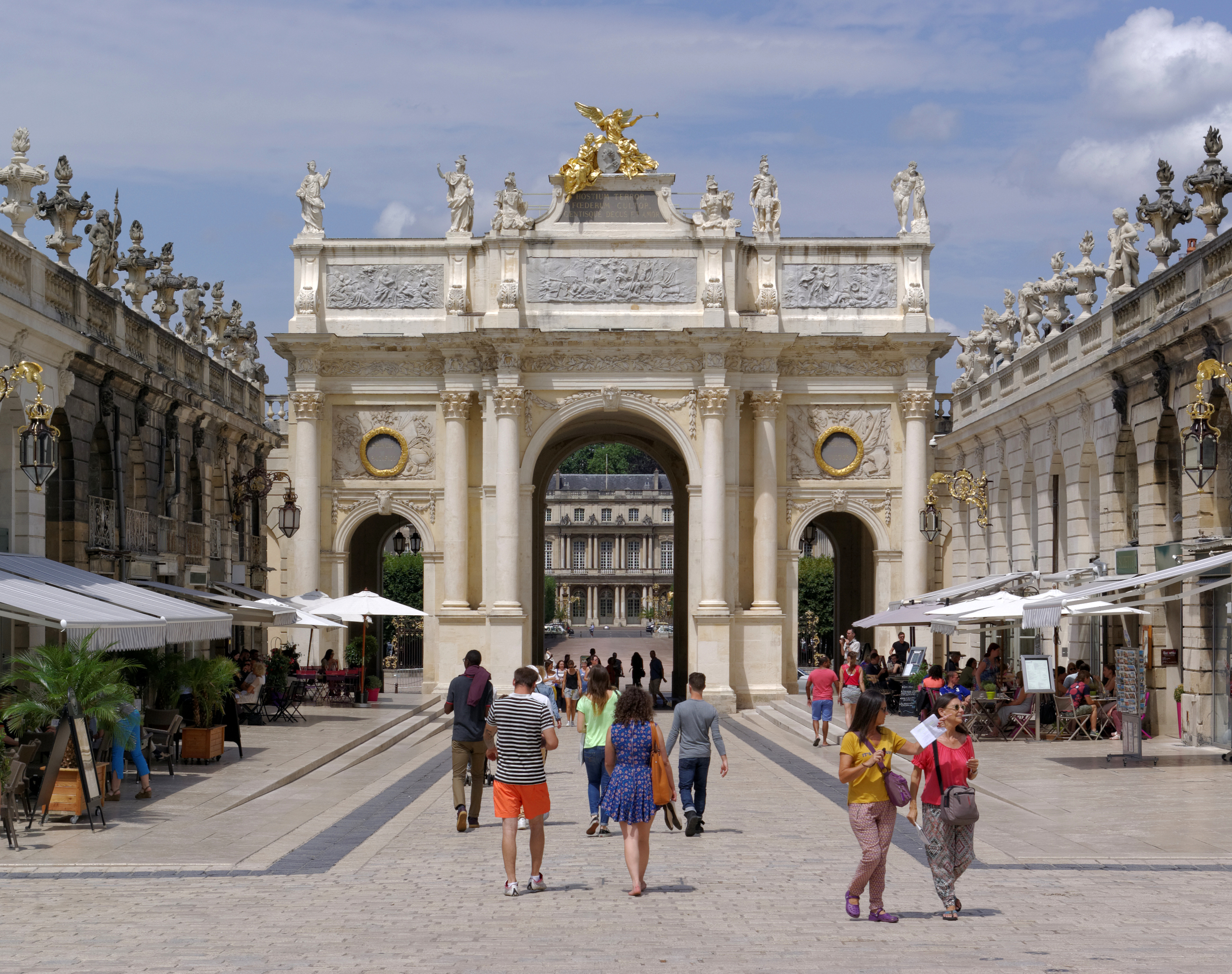
Place Stanislas – Arc Héré

The city is known for its World Heritage buildings at the Place Stanislas, which was opened April 2005 by Jacques Chirac after refurbishment.

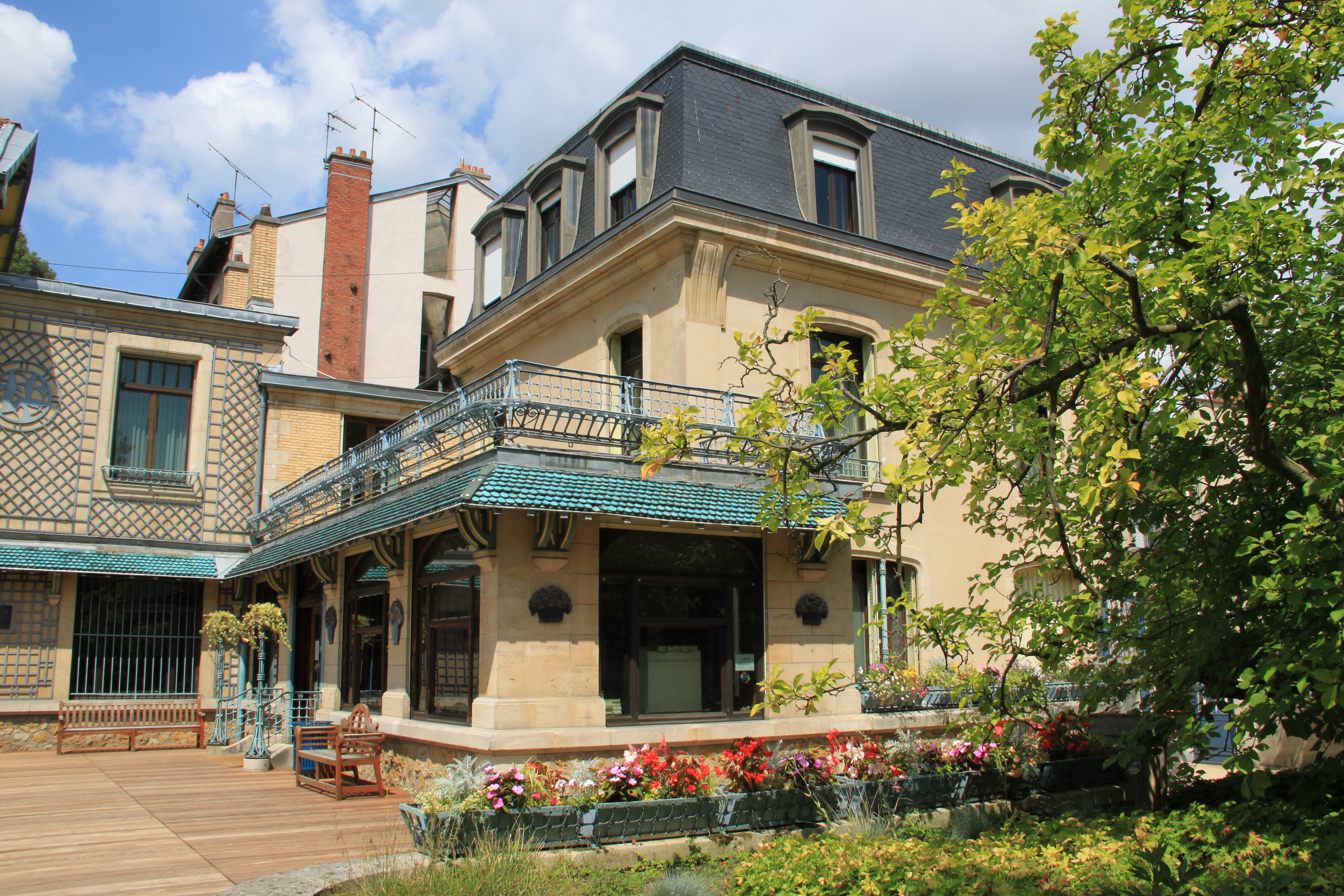
Museum of the École de Nancy

At the turn of the 20th century, Nancy was a major center of the Art Nouveau with the École de Nancy. The city possesses a unique and interesting Musée de l'École de Nancy (School of Nancy Museum) with artworks by Émile Gallé, Louis Majorelle, Daum, Caravaggio, and others. Nancy also has other museums:

- Museum of Fine Arts of Nancy (Musée des Beaux-Arts de Nancy) with painters from the 15th to 20th centuries, and a huge collection of Daum crystal displayed in part of the old fortifications of the city.
- Lorraine History Museum dedicated to the history of the Duchy of Lorraine and arts (Jacques Callot collection, Georges de La Tour).
- Aquarium and Natural History Museum of Nancy.
- Musée de l'École de Nancy offers a testimony of the diversity of creative techniques practiced by the artists of this school, with a fine display of furniture, objets d'art, glassware, stained-glass, leather, ceramics, textiles, etc. from the period.
- The Iron History Museum

The city is also the seat of the Diocese of Nancy and the home of the Opéra national de Lorraine. There is a network of libraries, the central of which is Bibliothèque municipale de Nancy.

Nancy is known for its macarons and bergamotes, candies flavored with bergamot essential oil.

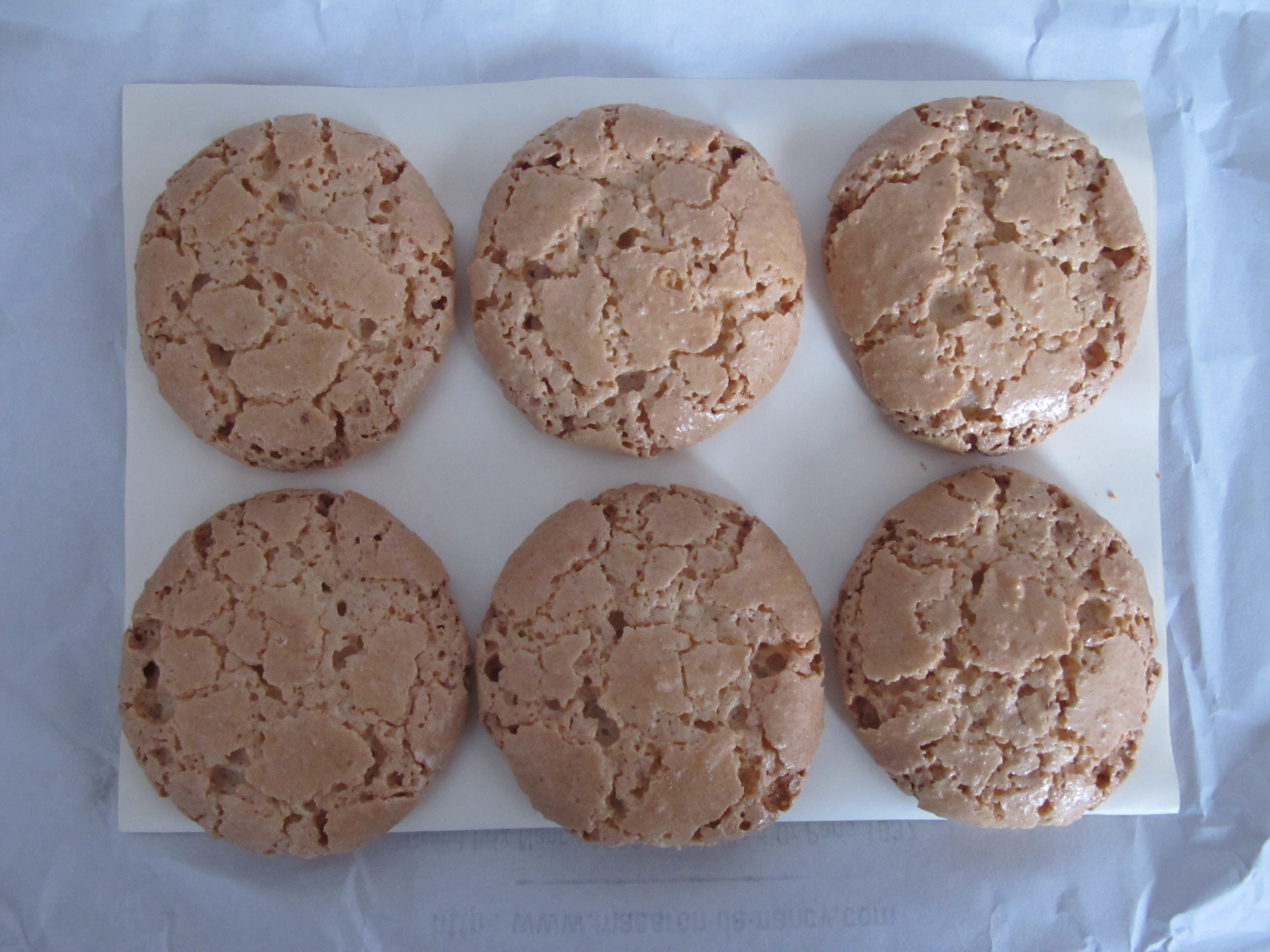
Macarons de Nancy

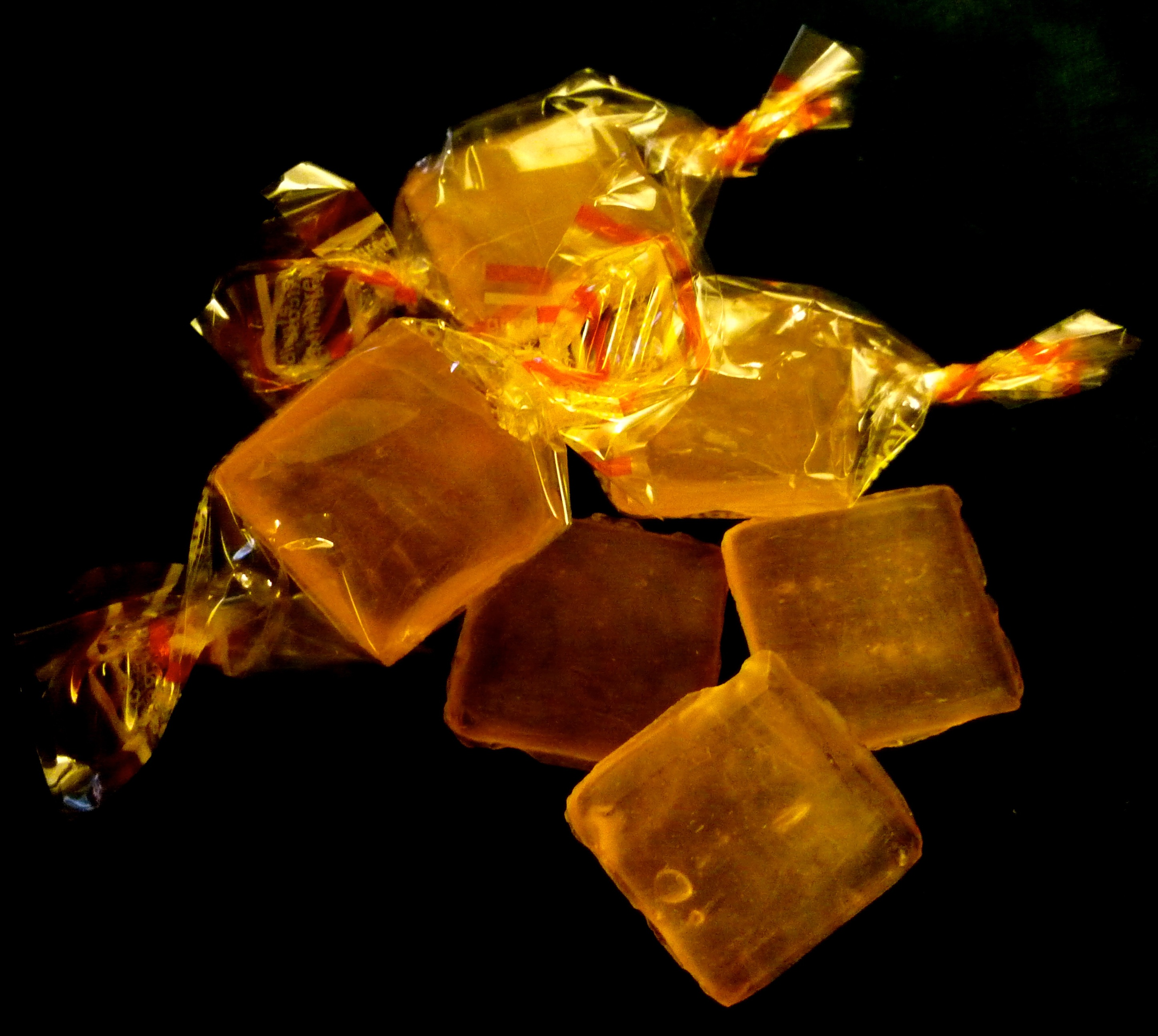
Bergamotes de Nancy

== Media ==
Regional television is served by France 3 Lorraine, part of France's national public television network, France Télévisions that broadcast from the city.

Local radio is provided by Ici Sud Lorraine, part of France's public broadcasting group Radio France and Radio Fajet, a community-based station.

L'Est Républicain is the city's local newspaper which publishes daily.

== Universities and colleges ==
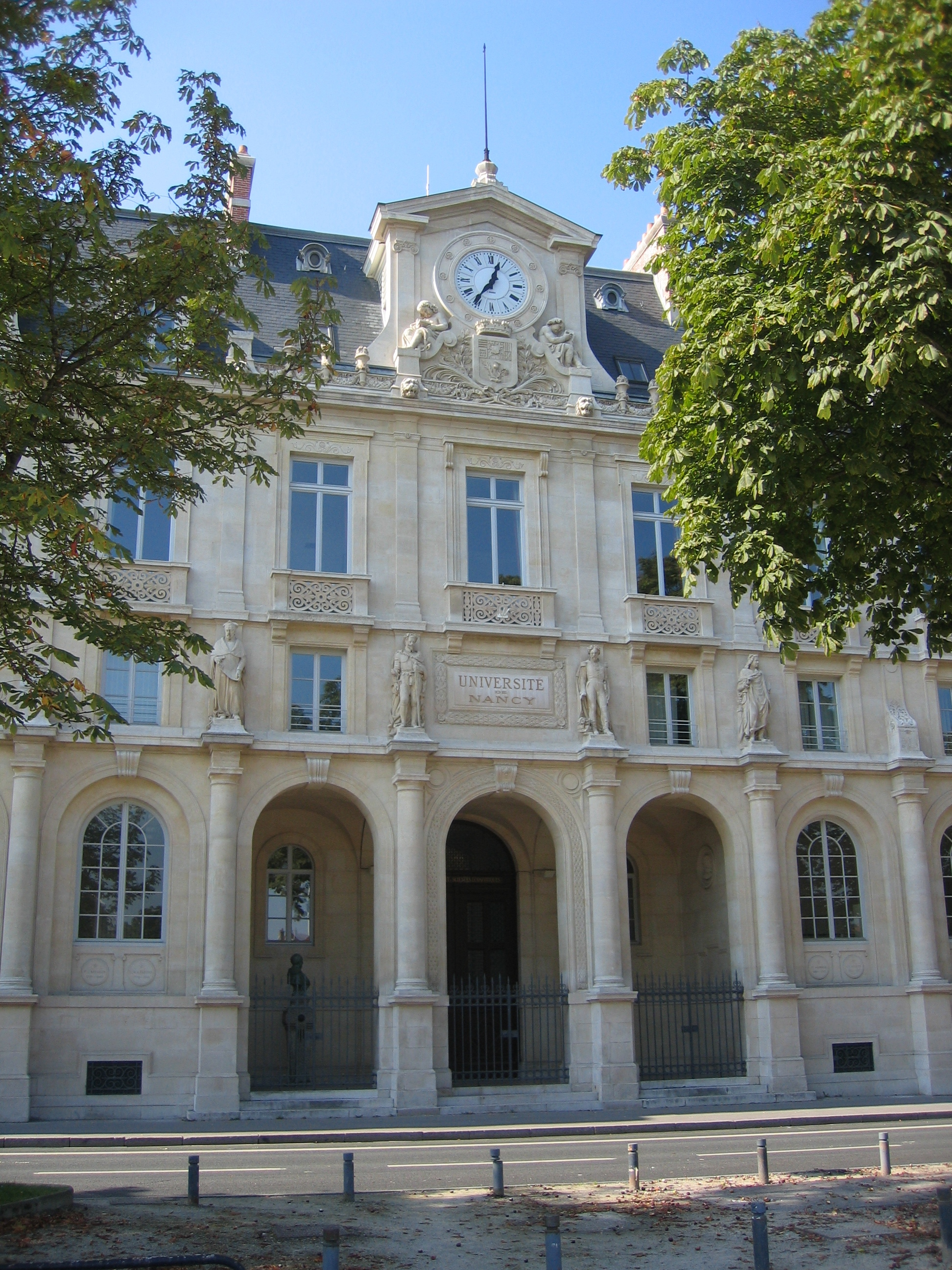
Faculty of Law, Economics and Management of the University of Lorraine

Nancy has a large number of institutions of higher learning:

- University of Lorraine which merges:
  - Henri Poincaré University (Université Henri Poincaré, UHP, also known as Nancy 1)
  - Nancy 2 University (Université Nancy 2)
    - European University Centre
  - National Polytechnic Institute of Lorraine (Institut National Polytechnique de Lorraine or INPL)
    - École nationale supérieure des Mines de Nancy
    - École nationale supérieure des industries chimiques (ENSIC)
    - École nationale supérieure d'agronomie et des industries alimentaires (ENSAIA)
    - École européenne d'ingénieurs en génie des matériaux (EEIGM)
    - École nationale supérieure d'électricité et de mécanique (ENSEM)
    - École nationale supérieure de géologie (ENSG)
    - École nationale supérieure en génie des systèmes et de l'innovation (ENSGSI)
    - Telecom Nancy (ex-ESIAL)
    - École Polytechnique de l'Université de Lorraine (Polytech Nancy)
- École des Beaux-Arts de Nancy
- École nationale supérieure d'art de Nancy
- School of architecture of Nancy (ENSA)
- École pour l'informatique et les nouvelles technologies (EPITECH)
- ICN Graduate Business School (Institut Commercial de Nancy)
- Sciences Po Paris (French-German Undergraduate Campus)
- Centre de Nancy-AgroParisTech
- École Supérieure Robert de Sorbon
- French National School of Forestry, est. 1824, in Nancy
- Web@cademie

== Sports ==
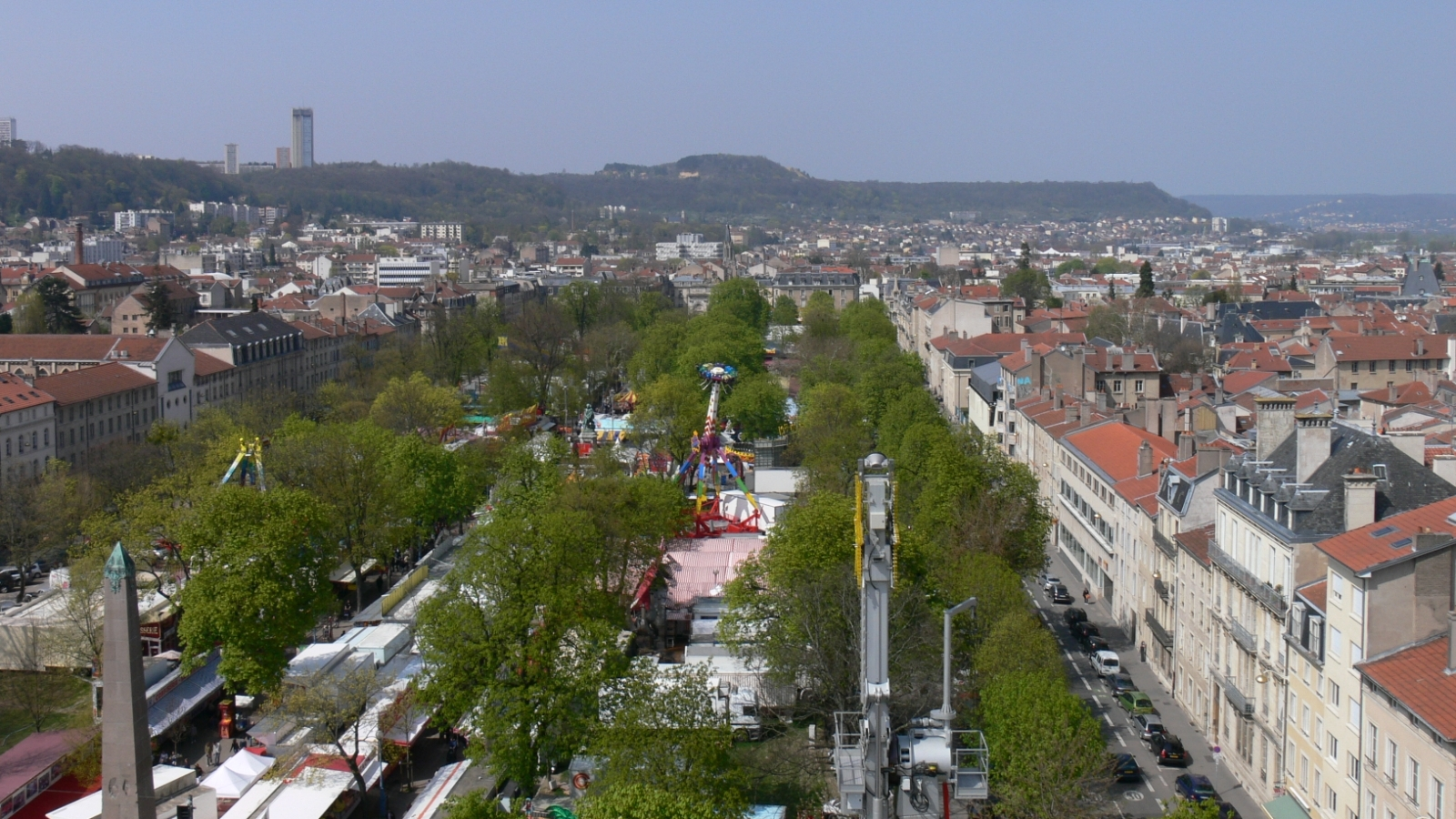
Cours-Léopold

Nancy is home to two of the three professional sport clubs in Lorraine: AS Nancy-Lorraine in football and SLUC Nancy in basketball. AS Nancy-Lorraine's Hall of Fame includes triple-Ballon d'Or and UEFA President Michel Platini, Arsenal manager Arsène Wenger, 1998 World Champion Aimé Jacquet, 2000 European Champion Roger Lemerre, 1998 African Ballon d'Or Mustapha Hadji, Irish legend Tony Cascarino, 1986 European Cup winner Sacha Zavarov and 1958 World Cup Semi-finalist Roger Piantoni.

AS Nancy-Lorraine won the French cup 1978 with captain Michel Platini who scored the only goal of the final (Nancy 1–0 Nice). More recently AS Nancy-Lorraine won the "Coupe de la Ligue" (French League Cup) in 2006 and reached fourth place in the French football league in 2007/2008.

SLUC Nancy won the last Korac European Cup in 2002, reached the finals of French championship of basketball (Pro A) four consecutive times and finally won his first trophy in 2008. Also winner of "Semaine des As" in 2005 and champion of 2nd league (pro B) in 1994.

== Prominent people from Nancy ==
- Lambert-Sigisbert Adam (1700–1759), a lorrain sculptor.
- François-Émile André (1871–1933), architect
- Marie Henri d'Arbois de Jubainville (1827–1910), historian and philologist.
- Charles Baudiot (1773–1849), cellist and composer
- Henri-Étienne Beaunis (1830–1921), physiologist, psychologists, defender of the Nancy School of Hypnosis
- Najoua Belyzel (born 1981), singer
- Jacques Benoit (1896–1982), physician, biologist and neuroendocrinologist
- André Bernanose (1912–2002), chemist, physicist and pharmacologist
- Hippolyte Bernheim (1840–1919), physician, neurologist, co-founder of the Nancy School of Hypnosis
- Louis-Émile Bertin (1840–1924), naval engineer
- Jean Galli de Bibiena (1709–1779), playwright
- René-Prosper Blondlot (1849–1930), physicist, best remembered for his mistaken identification of N rays
- Stanislas de Boufflers (1738–1815), statesman and writer.
- Jacques Callot (ca.1592–1635), baroque graphics artist, draftsman and printmaker.
- Henri Cartan (1904–2008), mathematician
- Charlotte Caubel (born 1972), magistrate, politician and minister
- Maxime Chanot (born 1990), footballer
- Émile Coué (1857–1926), apothecary, psychologist, hypnotherapist
- Paul Colin (1892–1985), poster artist
- Marion Créhange (1937–2022), computer scientist
- Grand Duchess Christina of Tuscany (1565–1637)
- Lucien Cuénot (1866–1951), geneticist
- Gérard Cuny (1925–1996), French gerontologist
- Dominique Delestre (born 1955), racing driver
- Matthieu Delpierre (born 1981), footballer
- Gérard Paul Deshayes (1795–1875), geologist and conchologist.
- Auguste Digot (1815–1864), historian of Lorraine
- Antoine Drouot (1774–1847), one of Napoleon's generals
- Joseph Ducreux (1735–1802), portrait painter, pastelist, miniaturist, and engraver
- Prosper Guerrier de Dumast (1796–1883), proponent of Lotharingism
- Pascal Dusapin (born 1955), composer
- Gisèle d'Estoc (1845-1894), writer, sculptor, feminist
- Lucien Febvre (1878–1956), historian
- Adèle Ferrand (1817–1848), painter
- Francis I, Holy Roman Emperor (1708–1765), duke of Lorraine and later Holy Roman Emperor
- Émile Gallé (1846–1904), Art Nouveau artist
- Edmond de Goncourt (1822–1896), author, critic, publisher, founder of the Académie Goncourt.
- Jean Ignace Isidore Gérard Grandville (1803-1847), illustrator and caricaturist.
- Gillian Henrion (born 2003), racing driver
- François-Benoît Hoffman (1760–1828), playwright and critic.
- Jean-Baptiste Isabey (1767–1855), painter.
- François Jacob (1920–2013), biologist who won the 1965 Nobel Prize in Medicine.
- Yves Lambert (1936–2021), aerospace engineer
- Nicolas-Léopold Liébault (1723–1795), collaborator of the Encyclopédie by Diderot and D'Alembert
- Ambroise-Auguste Liébeault (1823–1904), physician, co-founder of the Nancy School of Hypnosis
- Hubert Lyautey (1854–1934), Marshal of France
- Louis Maimbourg (1610–1686), Jesuit and historian.
- François René Mallarmé (1755–1835), statesman of the French Revolution.
- Aimé Morot (1850–1913), painter
- Charles Palissot de Montenoy (1730–1814), playwright
- Michel Picard (born 1931), writer, winner of the 2007 Feuille d'or de la ville de Nancy
- Michel Platini (b. 1955 in Jœuf), footballer
- Henri Poincaré (1854–1912), mathematician, theoretical scientist and philosopher of science
- Marie-Agnès Poussier-Winsback (born 1967), French politician
- Mlle Raucourt (1756–1815), a French actress, real name Françoise Marie Antoinette Saucerotte.
- Éric Rohmer (1920–2010), film director
- Pierre Roussel (1881–1945), archaeologist and epigrapher
- Henri Royer (1869–1938), painter
- Jean François de Saint-Lambert (1716–1803), poet, philosopher and military officer.
- Pierre Schaeffer (1910–1995), noted as the inventor of musique concrète
- Jean-Louis Schlesser (born 1948), racing driver
- Charles Sellier (1830–1882), painter
- José Touré (born 1961), footballer
- Arnaud Vincent (born 1974), motorcycle racer
- Élise Voïart (1786–1866), writer and translator
- Lucien Weissenburger (1860–1929), architect
- Virginie Despentes (1969), writer and filmmaker.

== Economy ==
Nancy's economy is anchored by its role as a regional centre for higher education, healthcare, and services. The city hosts the University of Lorraine, one of the largest universities in France with over 47,000 students, making education a major economic driver. The Centre Hospitalier Régional Universitaire de Brabois (CHRU) is one of the leading health centres in Europe, renowned for innovations in surgical robotics. Nancy has historically been significant in the iron and steel industries of Lorraine, and today the metropolitan area supports sectors including logistics, technology, and financial services.

=== Business ===
- Bellieni, a nineteenth and twentieth century camera maker

== Transport ==
The main railway station is Gare de Nancy-Ville, with direct connections to Paris (high-speed rail line), Strasbourg, Luxembourg City via Metz, Nice via Lyon and Marseille, as well as several regional destinations. The motorway A31 connects Nancy with Metz, Luxembourg and Langres.

A nearby regional airport Metz–Nancy–Lorraine Airport, halfway between Metz and Nancy, provides scheduled air service to several cities in France and some North African countries. The nearest international airport is EuroAirport Basel-Mulhouse-Freiburg, located 206 km (128 mi) south east of the city.

Public transport within Nancy is provided by Service de Transport de l'Agglomération Nancéienne (STAN), operated since 2019 by Keolis and including around 20 conventional bus routes and one trolleybus route. The Nancy trolleybus system has been in operation since 1982, originally with six routes. From 2001 until early 2023, the one remaining route was known as the Tram by STAN, because it used Bombardier Transportation's Guided Light Transit (GLT) technology. The system was replaced by conventional unguided trolleybuses, entering service on 5 April 2025.

== Heraldry ==
The greater coat of arms

The coat of arms of Nancy displays a thistle, originally considered to be a symbol of Virgin Mary, and adopted as a personal symbol by René of Anjou and later by his descendant René II, Duke of Lorraine. Contrary to the Scottish thistle, the one from Lorraine is always shown with its roots. During the wars against Burgundy, the thistle became an emblem for the people of Lorraine as a whole. It officially became the attribute of the city of Nancy in 1575 when Charles III, Duke of Lorraine granted the city its own coat of arms.

At first, the coat of arms of Nancy had a chief of Lorraine, which meant that the upper part showed the ducal arms, namely three alerions on a red bend. Later, the chief of Lorraine was replaced by a more complex one, which gathered the former possessions of the Dukes of Lorraine. The upper row comprises from left to right the arms of the Kingdom of Hungary, the Kingdom of Naples, the Kingdom of Jerusalem and the Crown of Aragon, while the lower row comprises the Duchy of Anjou, the Duchy of Guelders, the Duchy of Jülich and the County of Bar. The inescutcheon is the coat of arms of Lorraine itself.

The coat of arms displays the motto, which appeared at the end of the 16th century. It was initially "Nul ne s'y frotte" ("no one attacks it"), but it was changed to Latin "Non inultus premor" in 1616. The motto has a similar meaning to the Scottish one, "Nemo me impune lacessit", usually translated as "No one attacks me with impunity", which also makes reference to the thistle. The coat of arms further displays the Legion of Honour, awarded to the city after the First World War, and the War Crosses 1914–1918 and 1939–1945.

== See also ==
- Bibliography of the history of Nancy
- N ray, a figment of local physicist René-Prosper Blondlot's imagination, named for Nancy
- Parc naturel régional de Lorraine
- The great organ of Nancy Cathedral
- List of twin towns and sister cities in France
