= Jean-Henri Levasseur =

French cellist and composer (1764–1823)

Jean-Henri Levasseur, called "the younger" (29 May 1764 in Beaumont-sur-Oise – 1823 in Paris) was a French cellist, composer and music educator.

== Biography ==
Levasseur's father was a singing teacher at the Royal Opera of Paris, and from 1755 to 1757 an inspecteur général for a brief period. Jean-Henri Levasseur received cello lessons from François Cupis de Renoussard, who also worked at the opera, and then from Jean-Louis Duport. In 1789 he joined the Paris Opera Orchestra, where he then occupied the place of first cello until 1823. He was appointed professor of the Conservatoire de Paris at the time of its formation and taught there for thirty-eight years. His main students were Jacques-Michel Hurel de Lamare, Charles Baudiot and Louis Norblin. Levasseur was also attached to the music of the Emperor Napoleon and then to King Louis XVIII's chapel.

Levasseur was one of the main collaborators of the cello method conceived by Pierre Baillot and adopted for teaching at the Conservatoire de Paris.

== Selected compositions ==
- Sonates pour violoncelle, Op. I; Paris, Naderman;
- Duos pour deux violoncelles, liv. 1 et 2; Paris, Louis;
- Exercices pour le violoncelle, Op. 10, Paris, Langlois.

== Sources ==
- François-Joseph Fétis, Arthur Pougin, Biographie universelle des musiciens et bibliographie générale de la musique, Paris, Firmin-Didot, vol.5, 1881, (p. 290).
