= Gérard Cuny =

French gerontologist (1925–1996)

Gérard Cuny (7 May 1925 – 26 December 1996) was a French gerontologist. He occupied senior positions in geriatric services in Nancy and the Lorraine region. He was a founding member of the French Society of Gerontology and was its president from 1970 to 1974. He was instrumental in re-launching the Nancy Gerontology school, and founded the precursor to the European Geriatric Club.

== Biography ==
Gérard Cuny completed his secondary school and his medical studies in Nancy. He began as an extern in 1946 and in 1950 he became an intern. His thesis, defended in 1955, was dedicated to hypertension in the elderly. His activity as a Chef de clinique between 1953 and 1957 inaugurated his actions in the field of geriatrics.

In 1958, he was appointed head of the laboratory of medical pathology of the geriatric clinic opened the year before by Professor Herbeuval. An intern in medical pathology in 1959, he was Agrégé de médecine in 1961 before becoming a Maître de Conférences Agrégé de Médecine Générale et Thérapeutique - Médecin des Hôpitaux in 1964. He became a professor in 1969.

In October 1958, he participated in the first meeting of the clinical European section of the International Association of Gerontology in Sunderland (England), during which Herbeuval and Cuny presented a paper on "Treatment of prostate cancer and adenoma of the prostate" in the session on "Genito-urinary disturbances in old age". Together with E. Woodford-Williams, he ensured the secretariat of the second meeting of this section, held in Vittel and Nancy in June 1959, under the chairmanship of R. Herbeuval and the honorary presidency of Dean J. Parisot. He attended subsequent meetings of the European section and the Congress of the International Association of Gerontology (The Hague, Brussels, Copenhagen, San Remo, and London).

== Legacy ==
Cuny contributed to reactivating the Nancy Gerontology school, which had from 1878 to 1913 provided complementary teaching in geriatrics, and he continued developing this current with determination.

He was a founding member of the French Society of Gerontology, and was its president from 1970 to 1974. Meanwhile, he founded the Society of Gerontology of the East which he presided from 1976 to 1979. He was a founding member of the O.N.P.A. (Office Nancéien des Personnes Agées). In 1971, he created the Franco-British Geriatrics club, whose first meeting was held in Glasgow and which later became the European Geriatric Club.

He developed a geriatric rehabilitation practice in Nancy. Cuny was project manager before becoming the technical adviser.

He has served as:

- Chairman of the Lorraine Centre for Social Gerontology
- President of the Lorraine research Foundation
- Member, Scientific Advisory Board of the Center for Preventive Medicine of Nancy
- President, French University Hospital Committee
- Member, Scientific Council of the National Institute of Demographic Studies
- Member of the board of the Scientific Council of the National Foundation of Gerontology
- Member, High Medical Committee of Social Security

In 1993, he founded the Certificat Européen de Gérontologie en Action Sociale, whose Scientific Committee he presided until 1996.
