= Charles Baudiot =

French classical cellist and composer (1773–1849)

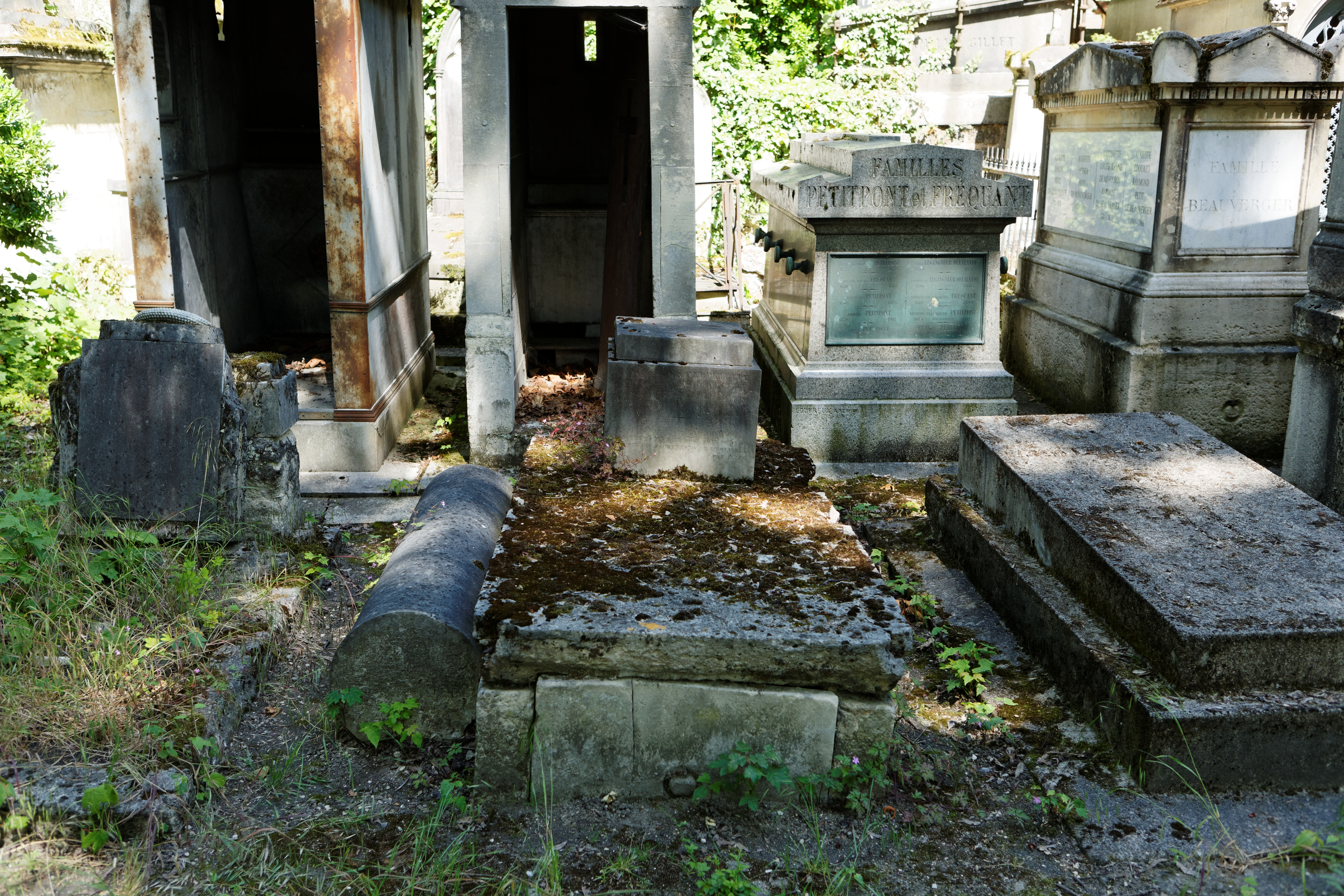
- Grave at Père-Lachaise Cemetery
- Born: 29 March 1773; Nancy
- Died: 26 September 1849 (aged 76); Paris
- Occupations: Cellist; Composer

Charles-Nicolas Baudiot (French: [ʃaʁl bodjo]; 29 March 1773 – 26 September 1849) was a French classical cellist and composer.

== Biography ==
Baudiot received lessons from Jean-Baptiste Janson the older, and succeeded his master as professor at the Conservatoire de Paris in 1802. Shortly after his entrance into this school, he was commissioned to do with Jean-Henri Levasseur a cello method which was written by Pierre Baillot.

Baudiot, who held a post at the Ministry of Finance, was one of the professors who retained their seats at the Conservatoire, when it was reorganized in 1816 as the Royal School of Music, and he gained the title of first cello of the King's Chapel. In 1822 he applied for and obtained his retirement as professor of the Conservatoire with a pension for his former services. From then on, he made several trips to France to give concerts before dying at the age of seventy-four.

Baudiot is buried in the 17th division of the Père-Lachaise Cemetery.

== Compositions ==
- Two cello concertos; Paris, Frey
- Two concertinos for the same instrument, works of the 19th and 20th; Paris, Pleyel
- Trio for violin, viola and cello, Op. 3
- Two works of duets for two cellos, Op. 5 and 7
- Pot-pourri for cello, with accompaniment of quartet; Paris, Frey
- Three fantasies for cello with piano accompaniment, Op. 12; Paris, Pleyel
- Three, idem, Op. 20
- Three nocturnes for cello and harp; Paris, Pacini
- Two works of cello sonatas with bass accompaniment; Paris, Pleyel and Naderman
- Trios for piano, cello and horn, and for piano, harp and cello
- Various themes for cello and piano
- Three duos with a progressive difficulty for cello and piano on themes of Rossini and Auber, Op. 31
- Cello method to the use at the Conservatory, with Levasseur and Baillot; Paris, Brandus
- Complete Cello Method, Op. 25
- Instruction for composers, or notions about the mechanism and fingering of the cello and how to write for this instrument; Paris, Richaut
- Many pieces arranged after Lafont and Beriot, for the cello.

== Sources ==
- François-Joseph Fétis, Arthur Pougin, Biographie universelle des musiciens et bibliographie générale de la musique, Paris, Firmin-Didot, vol. 2, 1866, (pp. 274–5).
- Moiroux, Jules (1908). Le cimetière du Père Lachaise. Paris: S. Mercadier. p. 61.
