= Nicolas Liebault =

Nicolas-Léopold Liébault (c. 1723 in Nancy – 1795) was an 18th-century French officer, writer and collaborator of the Encyclopédie by Diderot and D’Alembert. He was the author of two articles former, dresser and fuite, providing the definition of certain military terms (régiment de Royal Lorraine).

His father was a lawyer in Nancy. His brother was Nicolas-François-Xavier Liébault (1716-1800). The brothers were commissioned as officers of the depot of the Seven Years' War since about 1756 until 1758.

== Sources ==
- Jacques Proust (1995), Diderot et l'Encyclopédie. Albin Michel, Paris p. 516
- English Showalter (1985), Correspondance de M^{me} de Graffigny. Voltaire Foundation, Oxford p. 28-29
