= Sébastien Charlier =

Sébastien Charlier (Musician)
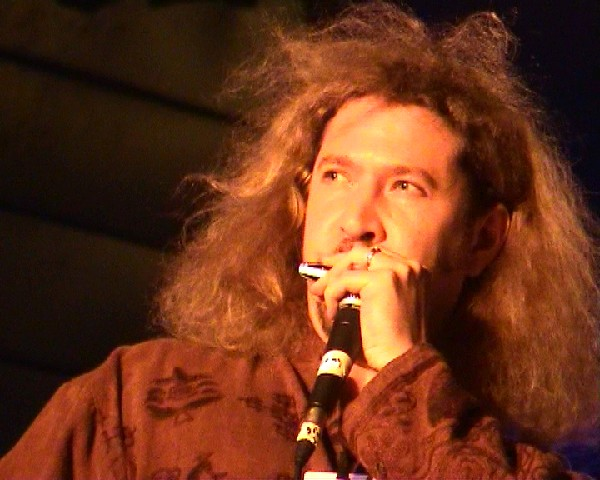

Background information
- Born: 25 October 1971 (age 53) France
- Genres: Pop, rock, electronic
- Occupation: Musician
- Instrument: Harmonica
- Years active: 2000–present

Sébastien Charlier (born 25 October 1971, Beaumont-sur-Oise) is a French diatonic harmonica player. He plays chromatically, in all keys, on a single blues harp. His music is inspired by many different influences, from blues to jazz, from fusion to electro-pop. He has also written two textbooks: Je débute l'harmonica and Méthode en poche harmonica.

== Discography ==
Solo

- Impasse des Mousserons, 1995, Electro Jazz
- Just Jazz, 1998, 9 jazz standards
- Diatonic Revelation, 2005, produced by Didier Lockwood
- Precious Time, 2009, Jazz Fusion
- La Coccinelle Geante, 2009, Electro-Pop
- Precious Time 2.0, 2016, Jazz Fusion

Collaborations:

- Six ½ - Six ½, chante Nougaro
- Jean-Paul Millier - Jazz par Millier

Pop / Rock / Electro:

- Karim Kacel - Une autre
- Laetitia Backwell – Changer d’univers
- Compilation – Tribute to Lee Brilleaux
- DVD Laurent Gatz – Gatz Band Live @ New Morning
- Too Much Processing - J'aime Ta Soeur

On soundtracks

- John Scott - Concerts pour l'Aventure
- Armand Amar, La jeune fille et les loups
- Patrice Peyriéras - Une famille pas comme les autres
- Thierry Malet – L'Héritier

Video

- Harmo Jazz
