= Bellieni =

French camera maker

H. Bellieni et Fils was a camera maker in Nancy, France, from the late nineteenth century until the early twentieth century. Several jumelle-type cameras, including stereo models, are known to have been produced from the mid-1890s to 1905; older, wooden-bodied cameras are also seen.

The firm was founded by Henri Bellieni (1857–1938).

== Cameras ==
- Wooden strut-folding cameras for plates, including 9×12 cm and 13×18 cm, about 1889. These have no shutter; one of the examples was sold with a Thornton-Pickard shutter, fitting in front of the lens.
- Folding 9×18 cm stereo camera, about 1893.
- Folding 9×18 cm stereo tailboard camera (a Chambre de voyages or Reisekamera), about 1900.
- Jumelle Simple: leather-covered wooden jumelle camera for 9×12 cm plates.
- Jumelle Simple à 2 Objectives.
- Jumelle Universelle.
- Stereo-Jumelle.
- Metal-bodied strut-folding camera, about 1905.
