= Beaumont-sur-Oise =

- Commune
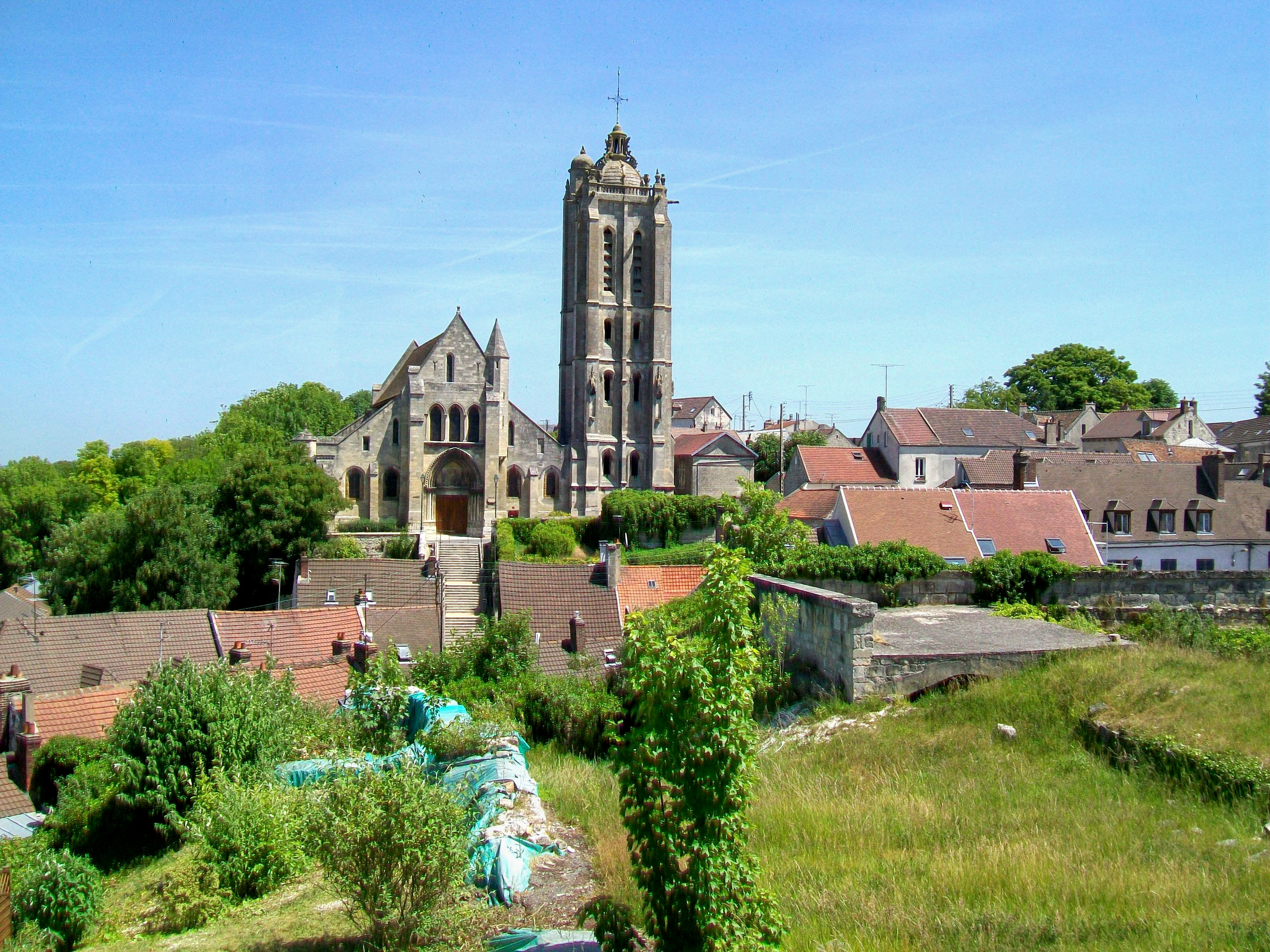
- The church of Saint-Laurent, in Beaumont-sur-Oise

- Coat of arms
- Location of Beaumont-sur-Oise
- Location within France Location within Île-de-France (region)
- Coordinates: 49°08′35″N 2°17′14″E
- Country: France
- Region: Île-de-France
- Department: Val-d'Oise
- Arrondissement: Pontoise
- Canton: L'Isle-Adam
- Intercommunality: Haut Val d'Oise

Government
  - Mayor (2020–2026): Jean-Michel Aparicio
- Area^{1}: 5.60 km^{2} (2.16 sq mi)
- Highest elevation: 210 m (690 ft)
- Lowest elevation: 23 m (75 ft)
- Population (2023): 10,232
  - Density: 1,830/km^{2} (4,730/sq mi)
- Time zone: UTC+01:00 (CET)
  - Summer (DST): UTC+02:00 (CEST)
- INSEE/Postal code: 95052 /95260
- ^{1} French Land Register data, which excludes lakes, ponds, glaciers > 1 km^{2} (0.386 sq mi or 247 acres) and river estuaries.

Beaumont-sur-Oise (French pronunciation: [bomɔ̃ syʁ waz], literally Beaumont on Oise) is a commune in the Val-d'Oise department in Île-de-France in northern France. The classical cellist Jean-Henri Levasseur (1764–1823) was born in Beaumont-sur-Oise.

== Population ==
Historical population
Year	Pop.	±% p.a.
1968	7,315	—
1975	8,008	+1.30%
1982	8,004	−0.01%
1990	8,151	+0.23%
1999	8,390	+0.32%
2007	8,825	+0.63%
2012	9,418	+1.31%
2017	9,576	+0.33%
2023	10,232	+1.11%
Source: INSEE

== Notable people ==
- Sébastien Charlier, diatonic harmonica player
- Boubacari Doucouré, footballer
- Lassana Doucouré, footballer
- Presnel Kimpembe, footballer
- Louis Mafouta, footballer
- Michaël Murcy, footballer
- Timothée Pembélé, footballer
- Pierre Pucheu, industrialist, fascist, and member of the Vichy government
- Assa Traoré, activist

== See also ==
- Communes of the Val-d'Oise department
