= Ville Vieille - Léopold =

Neighbourhood in Nancy, France

Ville-Vieille - Léopold
- Neighborhood of Nancy
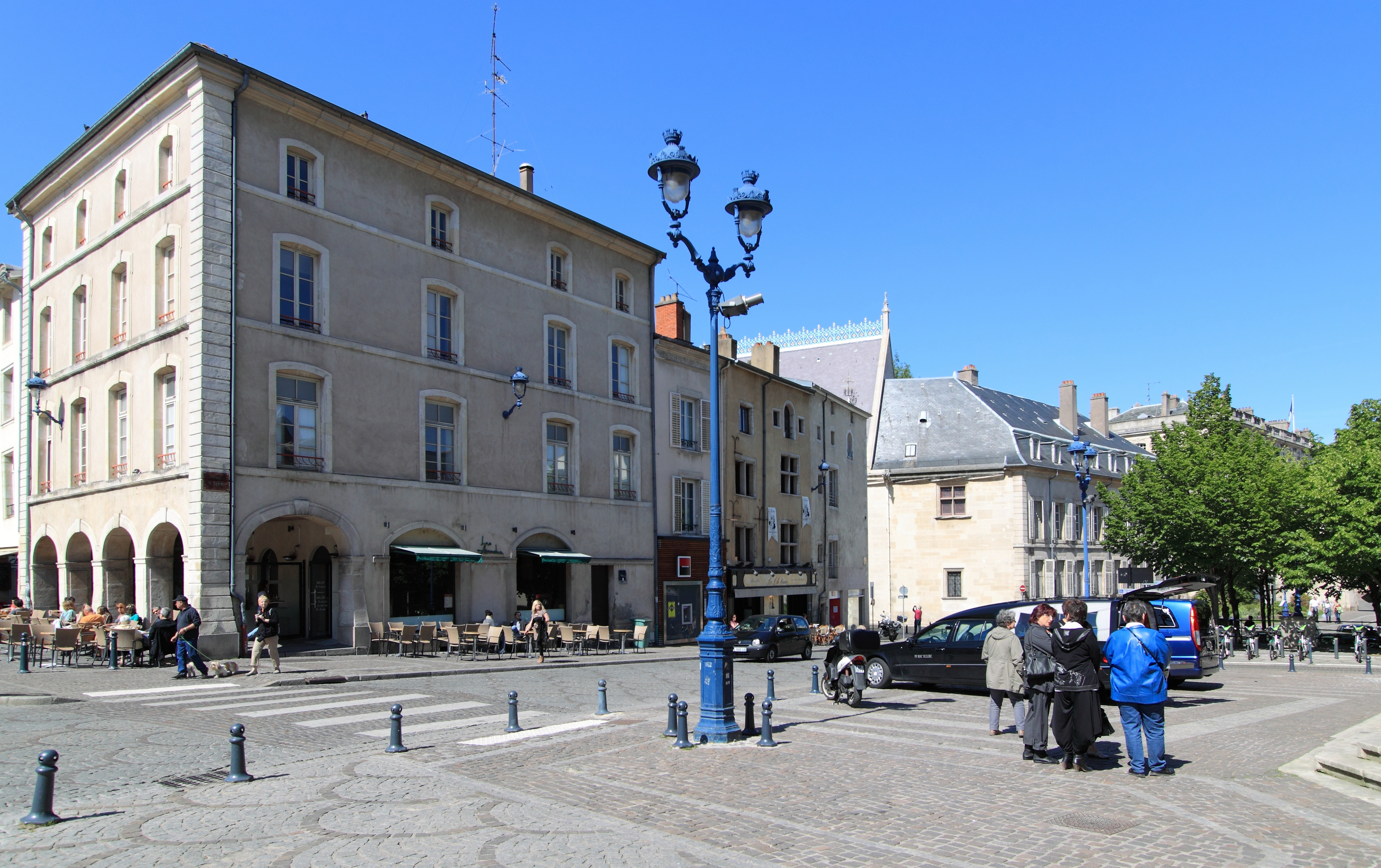
- Place Saint-Epvre

- Coordinates: 48°41′42″N 6°10′42″E
- Country: France
- Region: Lorraine
- City: Nancy

Ville Vieille - Léopold is an administrative region containing the oldest part of the city of Nancy, France.

== Location ==
The vieille ville (old town) is bordered by the Porte de la Craffe in the north, and is crossed by the Grande-Rue from north to south. The quarter is adjacent to the nouveau centre-ville (new downtown). The northern end of the Place Stanislas marks its southern limit with that of the ville-neuve (new town).

== Composition ==
This neighborhood is composed of the old town, as well as the adjacent quarter in the direction of the Cours Léopold. It contains Pépinière Park, and the Place de la Carrière.

The entire neighborhood is part of the Nancy historic sector and contains one of three locations registered as UNESCO world heritage sites.

Several very old roads of the old town let out on the Cours Léopold, such as the Rue du Haut-Bourgeois and the Rue de la Monnaie. In 1778, the Cours Léopold, a long square extended by the Place Carnot, was created on the site of the rampart ditches of the old town.

== Places and events ==
- Place Carnot
- Cours Léopold
- Faculté de Droit de Nancy (Université de Nancy 2)
- Palais du Gouvernement
- Conservatoire régional de musique

In summer, this neighborhood welcomes the foire attractive (the most well known of the Grand Est fairs), as well as the music festival "Nancy Jazz Pulsations"
