= André Bernanose =

French physicist, chemist and pharmacologist (1912–2002)

André Bernanose (17 June 1912 – 18 March 2002) was a 20th-century French physicist, chemist and pharmacologist.

He studied chemiluminescence during the late 1940s - early 1950s, which led him to discover the electroluminescence. He is for this reason considered the father of the OLED.

== See also ==
- OLED
