= Saint-Epvre Basilica =

Church in Nancy, France

Basilique Saint-Epvre
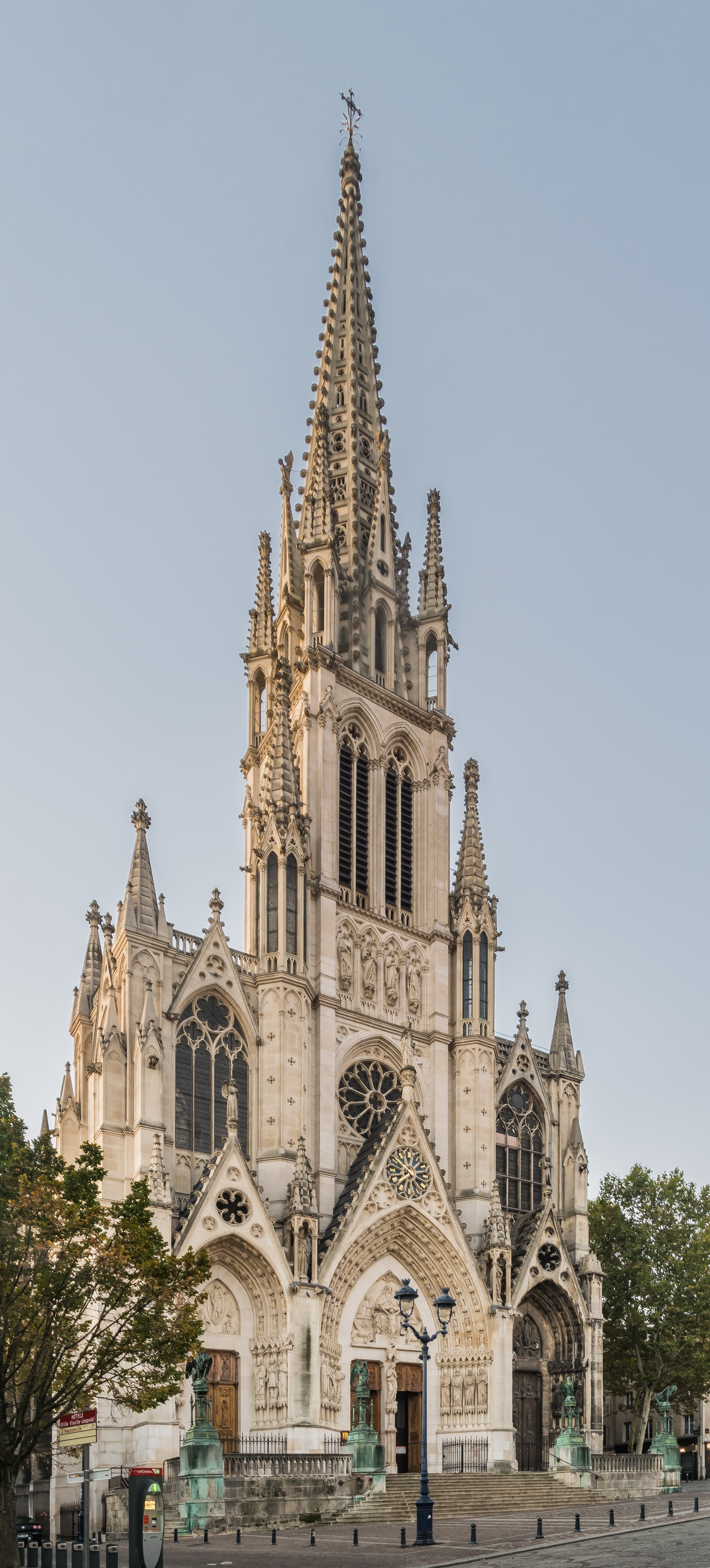

Religion
- Affiliation: Catholicism
- Province: Lorraine
- Region: Meurthe-et-Moselle
- Patron: Saint Epvre

Location
- Country: France
- Interactive map of Basilique Saint-Epvre
- Administration: Grand Est
- Coordinates: 48°41′45″N 6°10′48″E

Architecture
- Architect: Prosper Morey
- Style: Flamboyant gothic

The Saint-Epvre Basilica [sɛ̃.t‿ɛvʁ] in Nancy, France, is a basilica from the Rayonnant neogothic style, built in the 19th century by the architect Prosper Morey.

== Access and location ==
It is located on Saint-Epvre square, in Nancy, in the old part of the town.

== Origin of the name ==
The basilica, being the third church built in this location since the foundation of the Saint-Epvre parish in 1080, is dedicated to Saint Epvre, the Aprus of Toul, whose relics are kept within a shrine in the altar. It was sometimes called Saint-Épure, until the end of the 19th century.

== History ==
The duke Thierry II de Lorraine settled the parish church in 1080. Between 1436 and 1451, the edifice is rebuilt in the flamboyant gothic style, and the church spire was also used as a watch tower, because it was the highest viewpoint in the medieval town.

The construction of the new church in the second part of the 19th century, was based on a competition in 1862, arbitrated by a commission in Nancy then by the Commission des Bâtiments Civils in Paris. This commission was composed of members such as Alphonse de Gisors and Hector-Martin Lefuel. It is Prosper Morey’s design that was chosen, although the architect had withdrawn his own project from the competition.

The church was demolished in 1863, the spire-watch tower that was supposed to be integrated to the new church lasted only a couple of years and then was knocked down in 1867. The foundation stone was laid in May 1864. In 1865, Joseph Trouillet received donations to finance the construction of this prestigious project, he was even supported by François Joseph Charles de Habsbourg-Lorraine who visited the building site on October 22, 1867, with his two brothers, Charles-Louis et Louis-Victor. With their help, Monseigneur Trouillet required the support of Napoléon III and won over the old lorraine nobility’s ... which awarded him with the nickname « king of the beggars and beggar of the kings ». The church was consecrated in 1871 by the bishop of Nancy, Joseph Foulon.

On November 26, 1874, the church is granted the title of Minor Basilica by the Pope Pius IX. The construction was finished in 1875.

During the First World War, bombs were dropped on Saint-Epvre basilica. During the night, from the September 25 to 26, 1914, a German airship dropped 18 bombs on the old part of town, which gravely damaged the church, destroying the roof in some places, and a part of the stained glass panels.

In September 1916, the priest Trouillet added a plate in the memory of Prosper Morey, inside the basilica.

In 1996, the parish was entrusted to the care of the Oratoire congregation, from Saint Philip Neri.

Saint-Epvre basilica was listed as a historical monument in 1999. Because of the cyclone Lothar in 1999, and due to pollution, different renovation campaigns have taken place over the years.

In December 2012, the basilica hosted the wedding of the archduke Christophe of Habsbourg-Lorraine (born in 1988), the son of Charles-Christian de Habsbourg-Lorraine and a descendant of the dukes of Lorraine, with Adélaïde Marie Beatrice Drapé-Frisch (born in 1989).

On December 15, 2013, during a pontifical mass, a relic from Charles Ier de Habsbourg-Lorraine was brought to the basilica.

== Prosper Morey's reconstruction ==
The neo-Gothic façade designed by Prosper Morey

The idea of reconstructing the edifice in a neo-gothic style was not unanimous, and some critics were heard even before the architectural competition was launched. The opponents were against neo-gothic style, which was criticized in a polemical publication in 1859.

The competition for the creation of the basilica, opposed in 1862 Léopold Gigout, Louis Sainte-Marie Perrin and Prosper Morey. Out of the nine projects presented, it is the sixth, by Gigout, that was awarded a gold medal and a prize of 2000 francs. However, the rules made it possible for the city council to appoint the architect of its choosing. It was then Prosper Morey who was chosen by the mayor, Baron Buquet, who admired his work. The project was accepted on April 19, 1863, and Prosper Morey presented his architectural designs for the Saint-Epvre basilica, to the Salon des Beaux-Arts, in 1863.
