= Church of Saint-Fiacre, Nancy =

Church in Nancy, France

Church of Saint-Fiacre
- Eglise Saint-Fiacre; Eglise Saint-Vincent-et-Saint-Fiacre
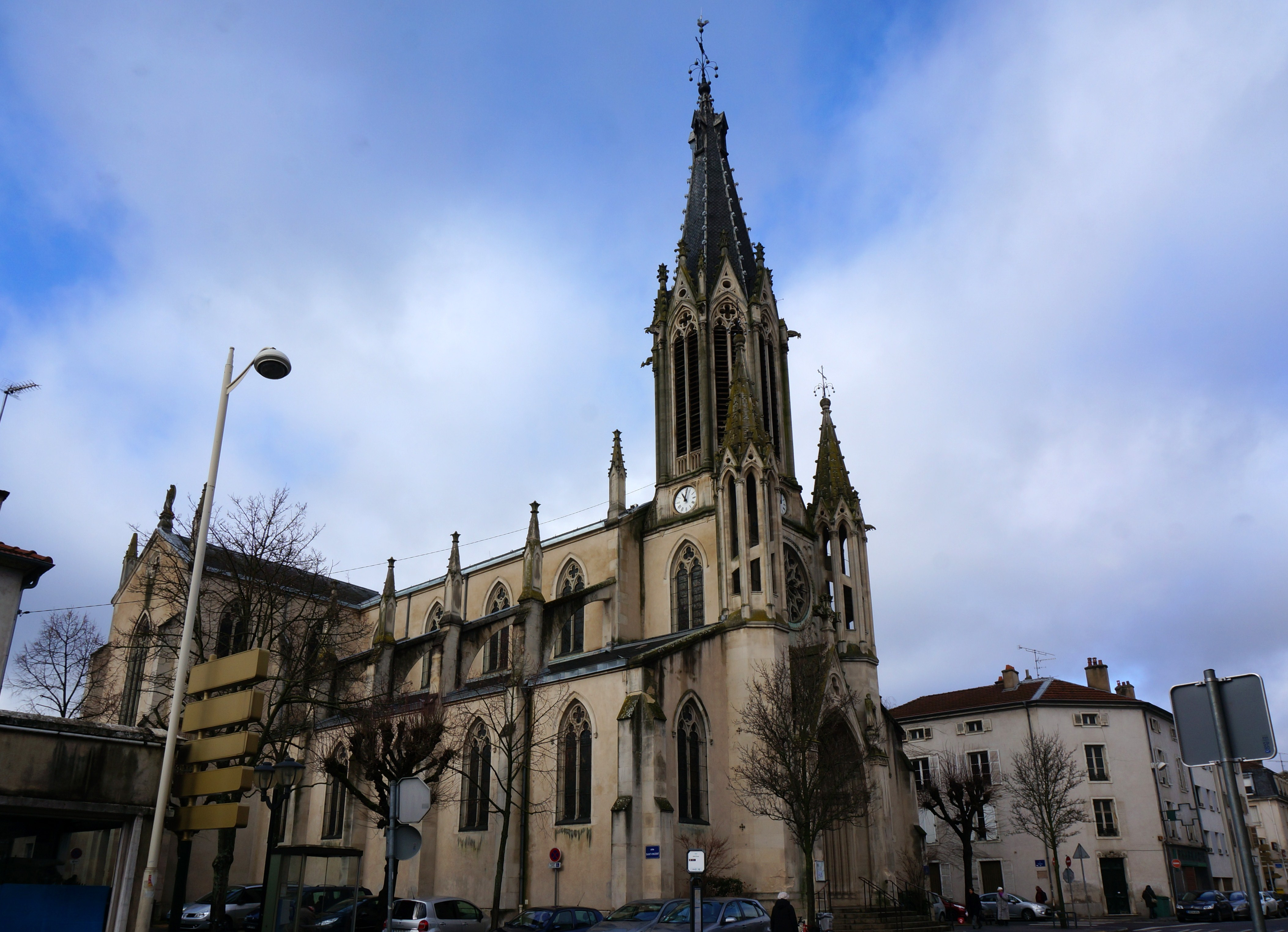

Religion
- Affiliation: Catholicism
- Province: Meurthe-et-Moselle
- Region: Lorraine

Location
- Location: Nancy
- Country: France
- Interactive map of Church of Saint-Fiacre
- Administration: Grand Est
- Coordinates: 48.7010°N 6.1715°E

Architecture
- Architect: Prosper Morey
- Style: Neogothic
- Completed: 1855

The Church of Saint-Fiacre (French: Église Saint-Fiacre) or Saint-Vincent-et-Saint-Fiacre is a neo-gothic style church built in the 19th century in Nancy, and it is dedicated to Saint Fiacre.

== Location ==
The Saint-Fiacre church is located in the middle of rue de Metz, which is situated north of Léopold square.

== History ==
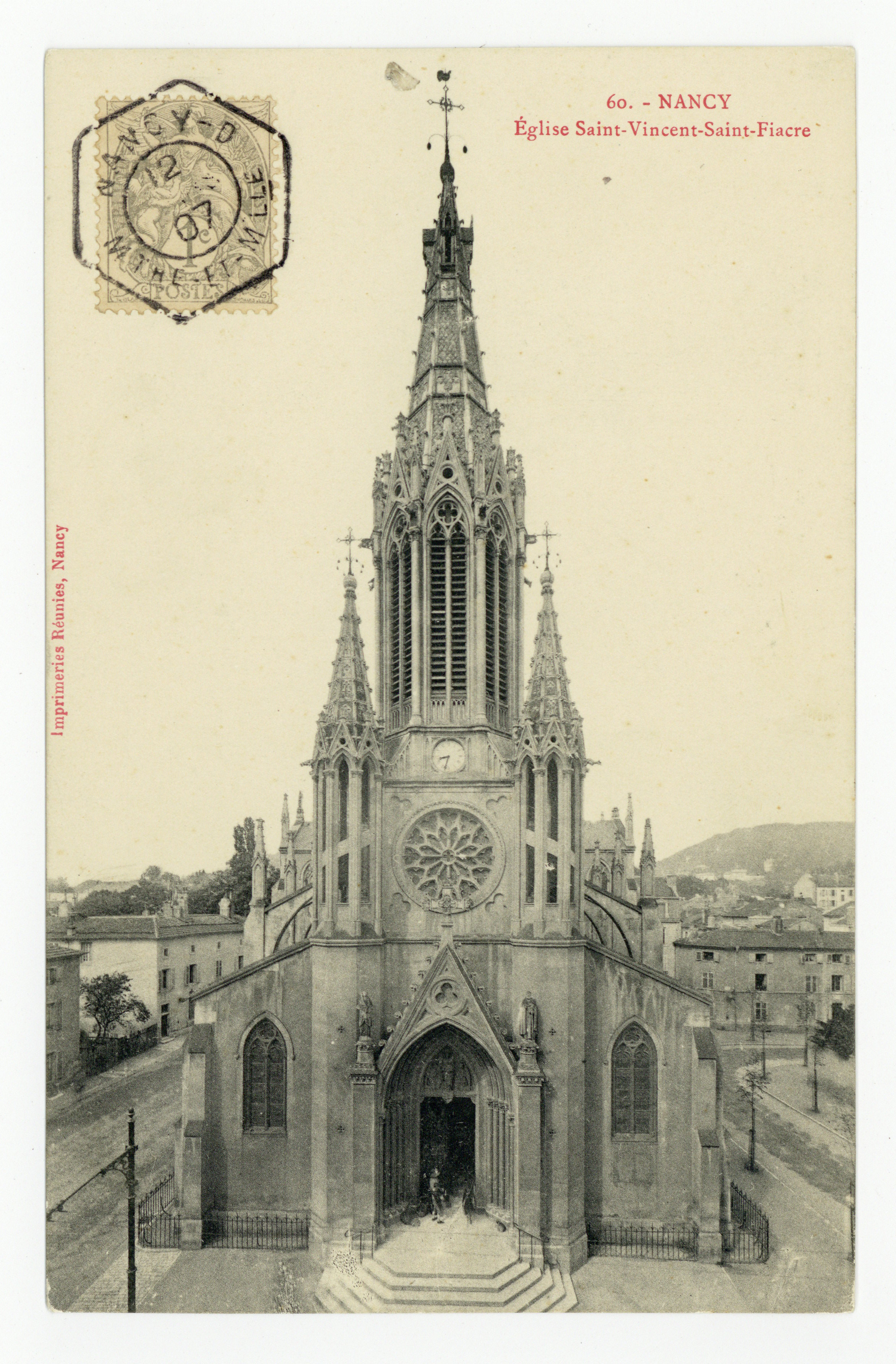
Postcard representing the church

The founding priest of this church is Joseph Simonin, who was born on 10 August 1798 in Drouville. He was the abbot Michel's nephew. Joseph Simonin was the priest of the Trois-Maisons parish from 1831 to 1858. He financed the construction of Saint-Fiacre church for a third party. He died in 1858, and now he is buried under the church's choir1858.

Saint-Fiacre church was designed by the architect Prosper Morey and inaugurated in 1855. It has taken over the old church from the Trois-Maisons faubourg and the villageBoudonville, that was built in 1721.

== Organs ==
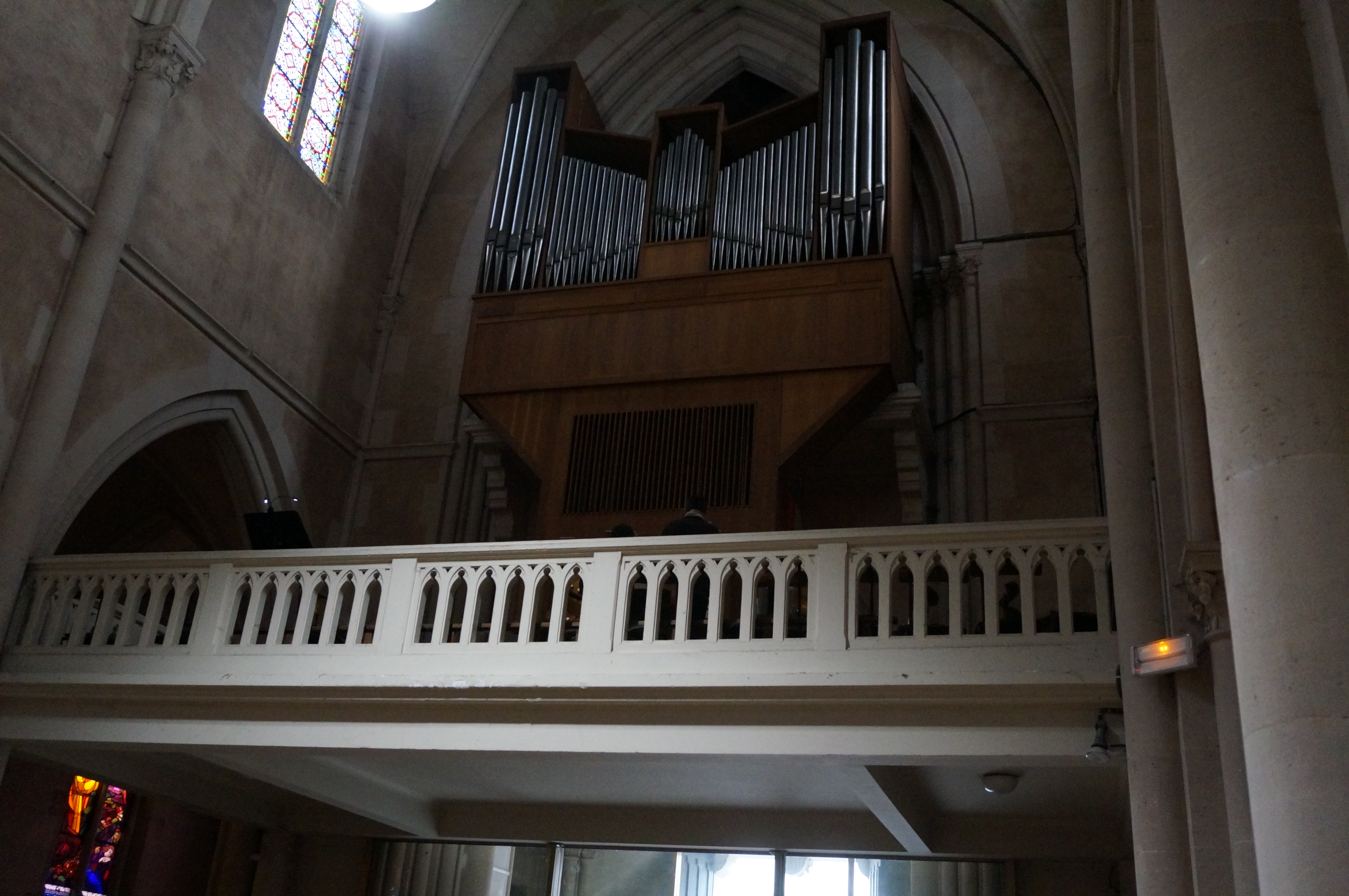
Organ

The great organs were renovated by Haerpfer-Erman between 1974 and 1976 with a new organ cabinet. They still retain the original pipes from 1856, designed by Jean Frédéric II Verschneider.

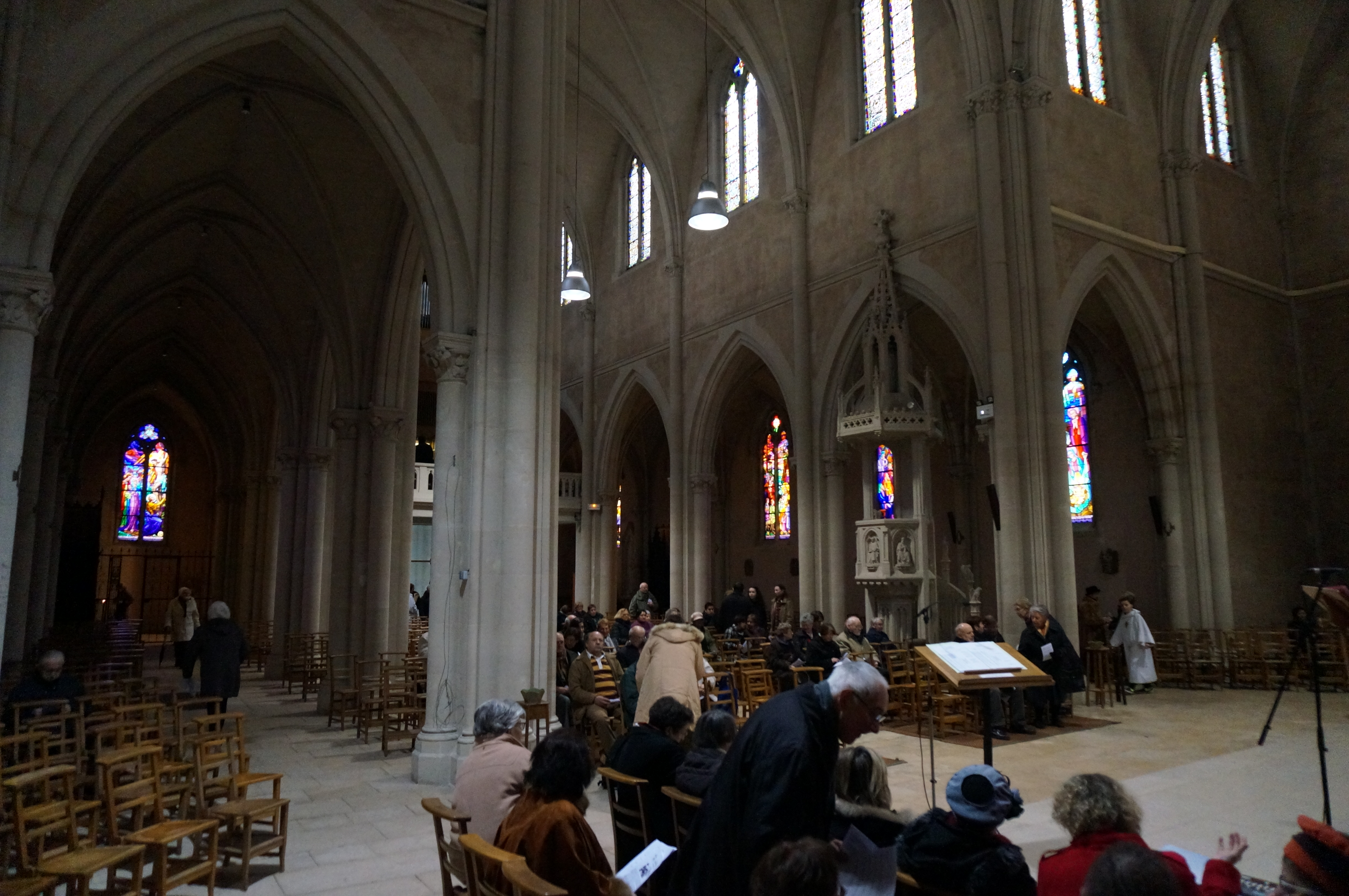
Nave and the pulpit, which is classified

== Architecture ==
This edifice was thought of by Prosper Morey. It was inaugurated in 1855.

It is composed of four altars, the choir's is classified, as well as the pulpit.
