= Covered market in Nancy =

Coordinates: 48°41′21″N 06°10′57″E

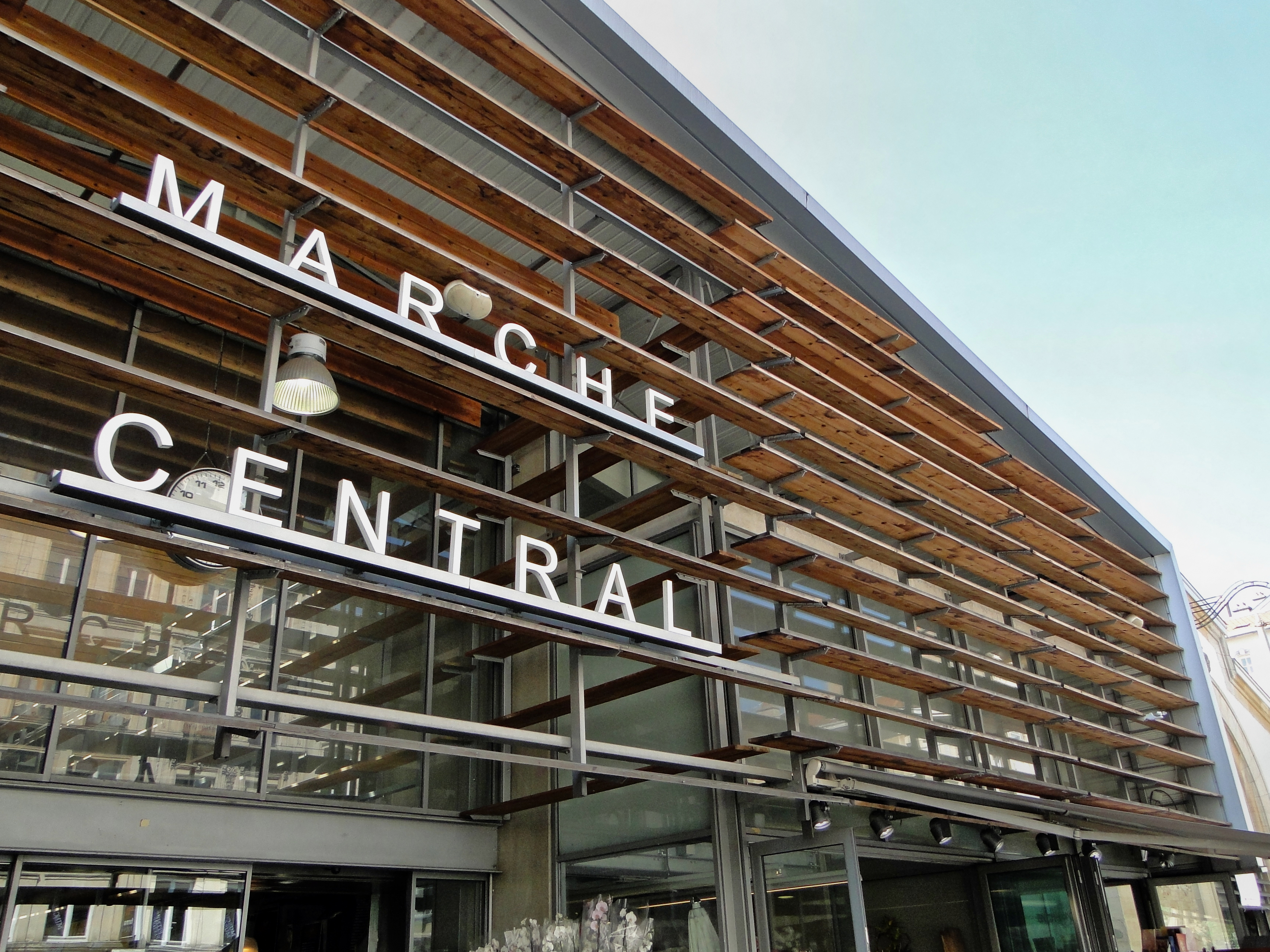

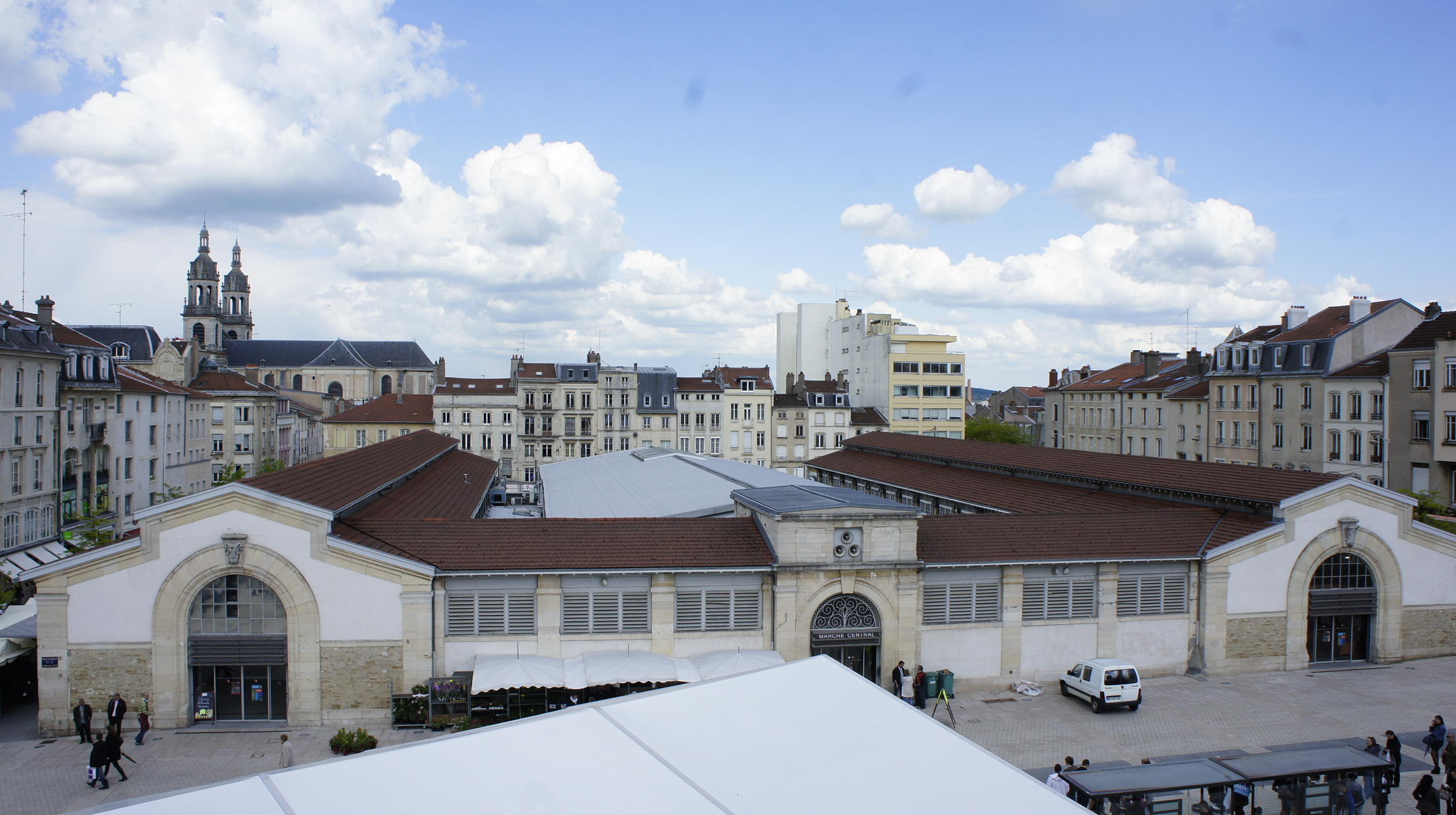
View from Charles III square, on the covered market

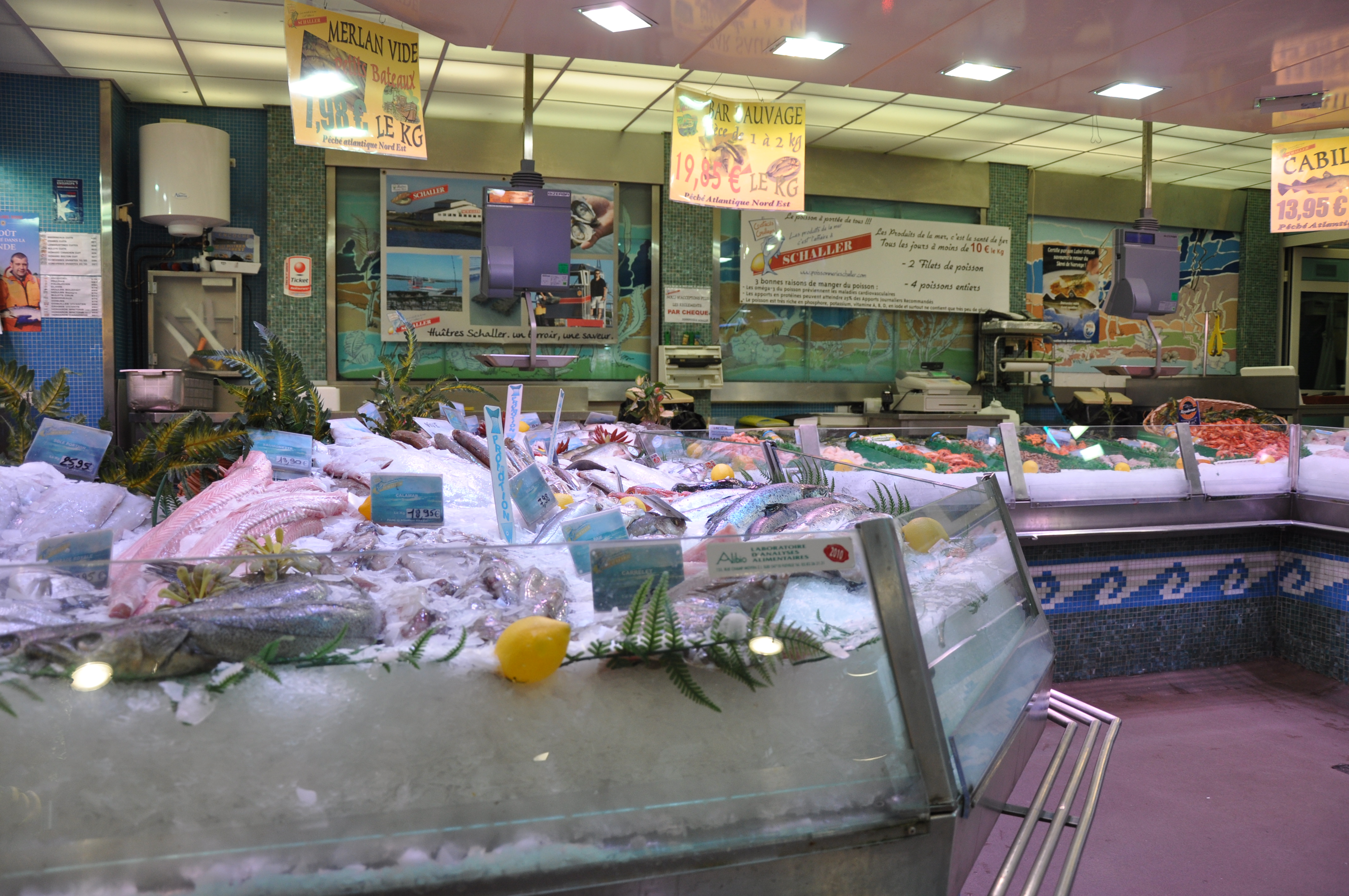
Fish stand in the covered market of Nancy, in 2011

The covered market, or central market in Nancy, is located on Charles III square, at the heart of the New Town of Nancy, between the Saint-Dizier street and the Quatre-Eglises street. There are around sixty merchants and fifteen greengrocers who gather in the market building.

It is one of the most important markets for the recognition of the Lorraine gastronomy, thanks to the high quality of the produce and the great variety, sold by 110 tradespersons. Twice a week, the esplanade situated between Saint Sébastien church, in Nancy, and the covered market, is occupied by stallholders.

The market building is not simply a place where one goes shopping, because it is possible to eat there, as there are different greengrocer restaurants. Florists and booksellers are also present in the market.

== History ==
The market has been settled on this location for four centuries. Indeed, it was first implemented as an outdoor market, at the time of the creation of the New Town of Nancy, by the duke Charles III de Lorraine, by the end of the 15th century. Before that time, the market was located on the Saint-Epvre square, in the Old Town.

The current building is dated from the mid 19th century, and was able to shelter the original outdoor market, which was then 250 years old. It was built after a petition was released on 21 July 1848, and the city council launched an architectural competition, on 4 December 1848. The city architect, Euclide-Justinien Thiebert's project was chosen on 17 August 1849, but as Thiebert retired in 1850, it was his successor, Prosper Morey, who was in charge of constructing the building. It was open to the public on 1 May 1852.

A central hall was created in the centre of the building in the 1960s. The building was renovated in 2003-2006.

== Description ==
The building is in a "U" shape, of 70x58 m, which leaves out in the middle, an area of 56x30 m which was initially an open space, now surmounted by a covered hall.

== Bibliography ==
- Encyclopédie d'architecture, t. XII, No. 1, janvier 1862, pl. 1–2; No. 3, mars 1862, pl. 26–27; No. 6, juin 1862, pl. 59–60; No. 8, août 1862, pl. 79–80
