= Place Vaudémont =

Square in Nancy, France

Coordinates: 48.6943°N 6.1821°E

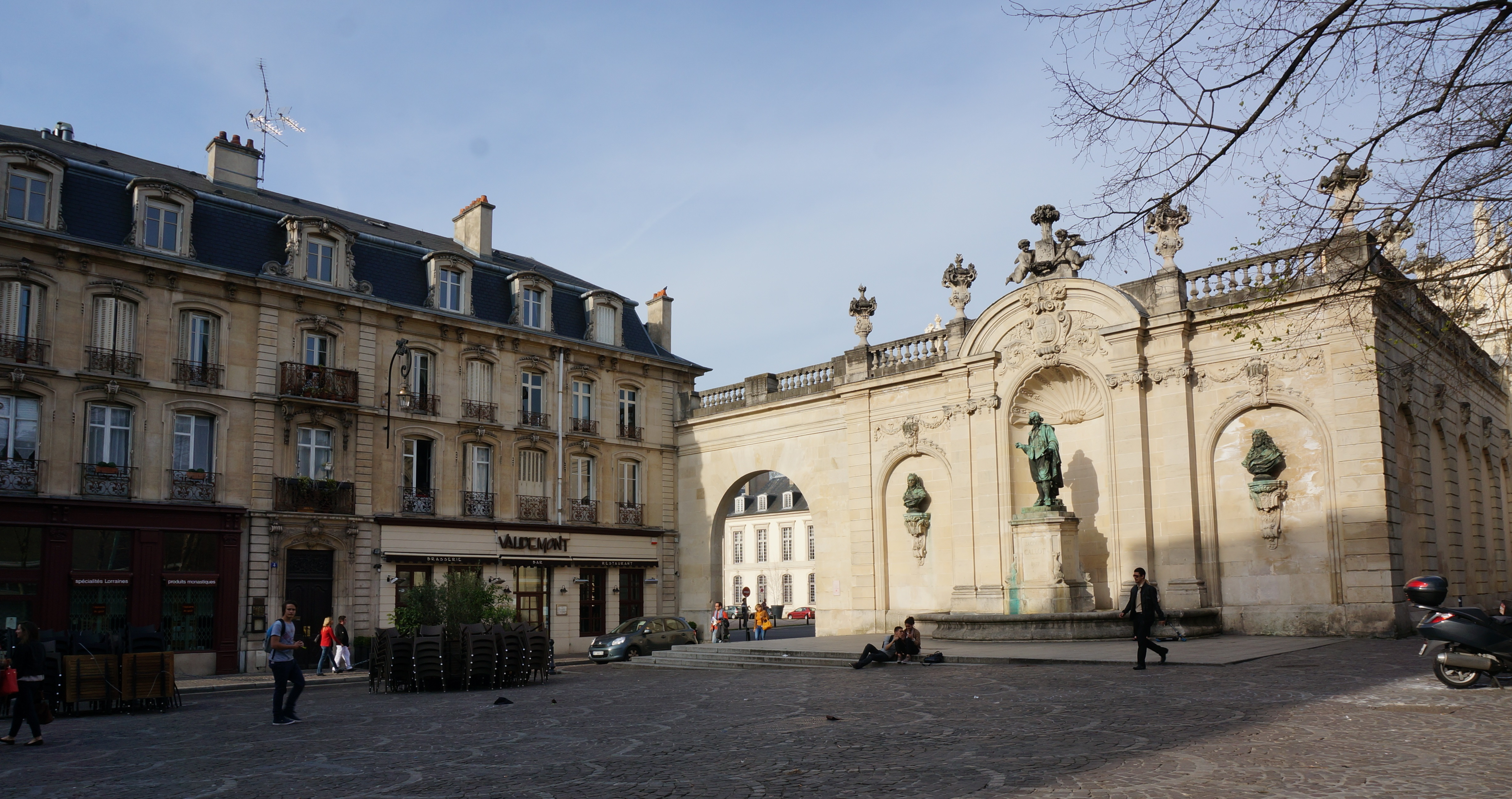
- Place Vaudémont seen from the Rue Gustave-Simon
- Interactive map of Place Vaudémont
- Type: Paved square
- Location: Nancy
- Quarter: Ville Vieille - Léopold

The Place Vaudémont (French pronunciation: [plas vodemɔ̃]) is a square in Nancy, situated in the French department of Meurthe-et-Moselle, in the Lorraine region.

== Location and access ==
The square is located within the historical center of Nancy. It is situated next to the Arc Héré, between the Place de la Carrière and the Rue des Maréchaux.

== Origin of the name ==
The name Vaudémont, other than being the bastion of the historical town, is a reference to one of the oldest and most acclaimed seigniorial families of the Lorraine duchy, the counts of Vaudémont.

== History ==
When the fortifications around the Héré entrance were brought down, a new path was created (Rue Gustave-Simon) and a new public area was implemented by the end of the 19th century. This was then called the Place des Chameaux ("Camel Square"), as a reminder of the exotic animals brought to Nancy by Leopold, Duke of Lorraine in 1698. In 1867, the square was called the Place de Vaudémont.

In 1877, Prosper Morey was asked to improve the square. He built a neoclassical facade on the Héré door's west wall, surmonted with antique style "fire pots", and a fountain at the base of it.

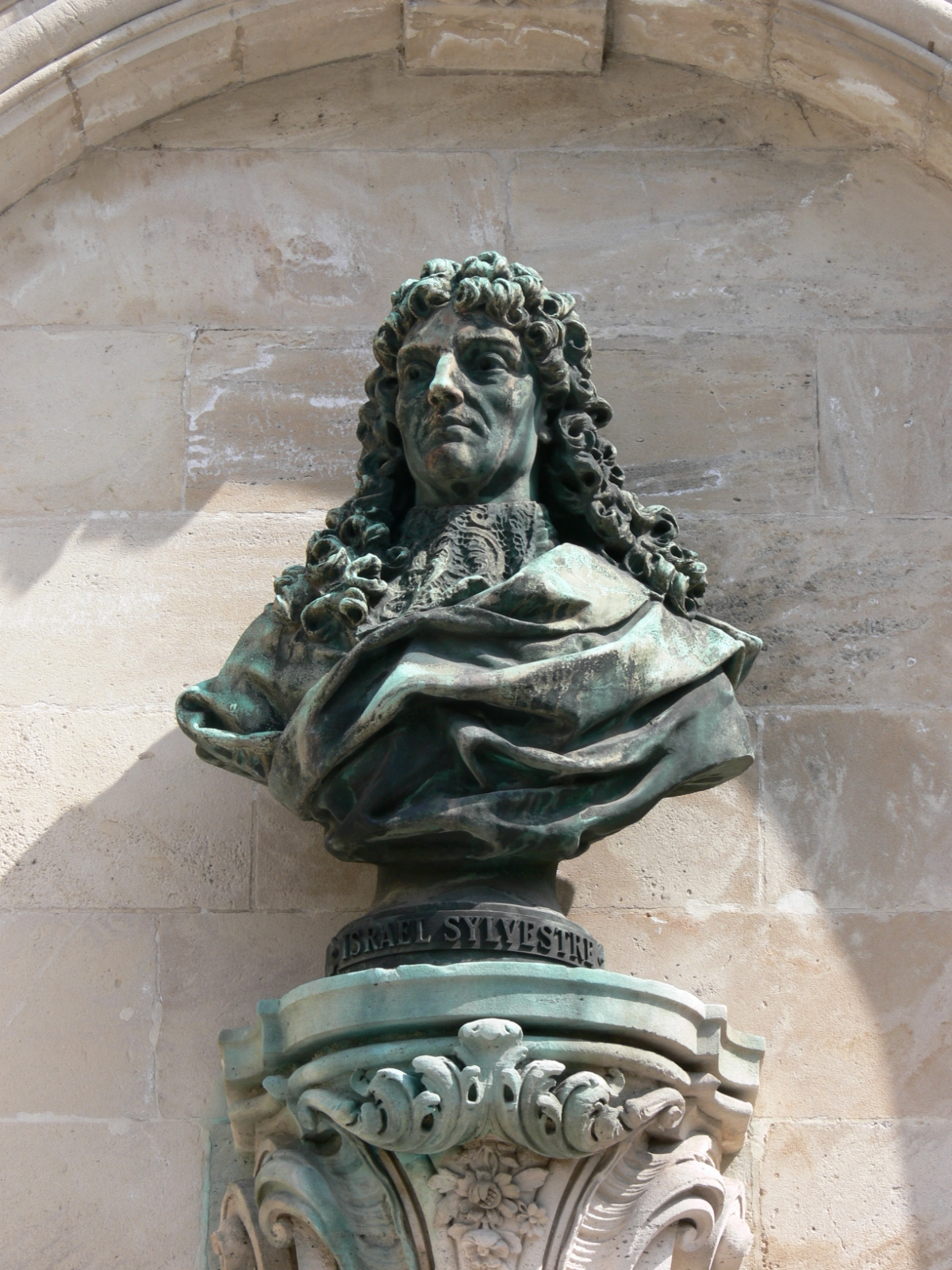
Charles Pêtre (1828-1907), bust of the engraver Israël Silvestre (1881), in front of the porte Héré.

On top of the fountain, which was unveiled in 1881, sits the statue of the famous engraver Jacques Callot, sculpted by Eugène Laurent. On either side of the fountain, the busts of the engravers Israël Silvestre and Ferdinand de Saint-Urbain, sculpted by Charles Pêtre, are displayed.
