= Prosper Morey =

French architect (1805–1886)

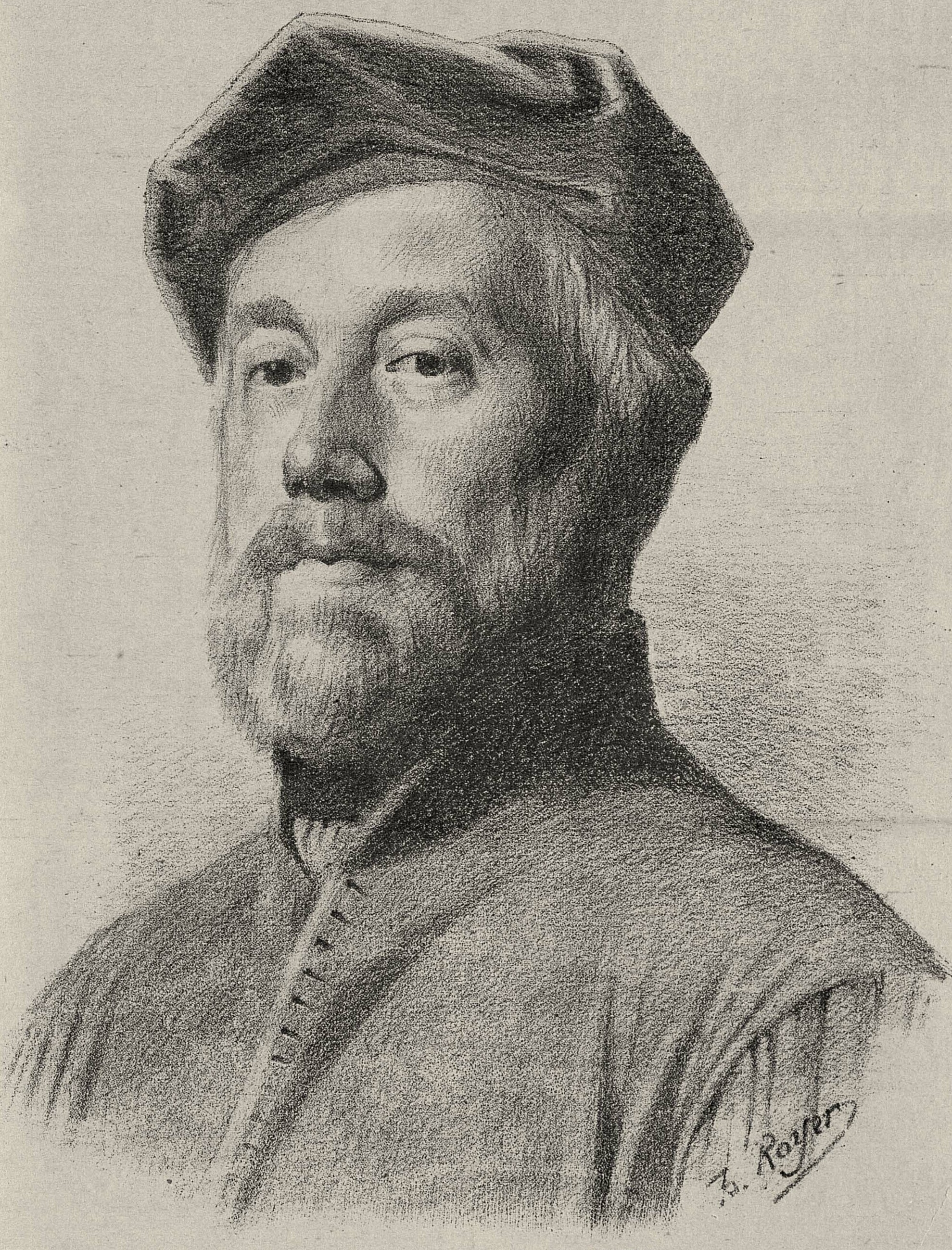
- Born: December 27, 1805; Nancy
- Died: July 5, 1886 (aged 80); Nancy
- Occupations: Architect, drawer, historian
- Notable work: Basilique Saint-Epvre in Nancy (France)

Mathieu-Prosper Morey was a French architect born on December 27, 1805, in Nancy (Meurthe-et-Moselle department in the East of France). He died in the same city on July 5, 1886. He played a major role in modernizing the capital city of Lorraine during the 19th century. Prosper Morey contributed mainly in Nancy with several civil and religious buildings such as Saint-Epvre basilica. Beyond architecture, Prosper Morey was also a historian, a scholar, and a member of the Académie de Stanislas. Over a hundred of his drawings, including drawings of the ruins of Pompei, are kept at the bibliothèque municipale de Nancy.

== Origins and education ==
=== Early life ===
Prosper Morey was born in Nancy in the actual rue des Quatre-Eglises. He was the son of Jean-François Morey, a plasterer and Reine Sauret. His childhood and initial education are not known; he may have started working as an apprentice in the building trades. Unlike many architects of his time, he belonged to a lower social class. Despite this background, he prepared successfully the entrance examination to the Beaux-Arts de Paris. Such an ambition, added to the financial effort, is probably linked to a soon revealed talent, in addition to family support.

=== Studies at the Beaux-Arts de Paris ===
Prosper Morey entered the Beaux-Arts de Paris in 1827. He attended the classes of Achille Leclère, a French architect during whose course he first encountered Eugène Viollet-le-Duc, an even more famous French architect well known for his restoration of Notre-Dame de Paris.

Several testimonies of his time as a student exist in the form of drawing exercises, including sketches for a staircase, a library, copies of a house created by Baldassare Pedruzzi, a water tank, the Chapelle expiatoire in Paris or Tuileries engines... A sketchbook exists and shows the classical architectural style students were learning. Prosper Morey's academic performance was outstanding; he won the Prix de Rome in architecture in 1831 for a project on a thermal spa, mandatory subject. The interpretation he gave distinguished itself wit a majestic composition and antique taste already high.

=== French Academy in Rome and submissions from Rome ===
Laureates of the Grand Prix de Rome would have the opportunity to travel and study in Rome. As such, Morey stayed in Villa Médicis from January 1832 until the end of spring in 1837. Prosper Morey there diligently fulfilled his duties, earning regular praise from the Academy of Fine Arts which judged the annual submissions by students. At the Villa Médicis led by Horace Vernet and later Ingres, his fellow workers included Léon Vaudoyer, Victor Baltard and Hector Berlioz. He also met Gottfried Semper who had come around Messine to study antique architecture.

Submissions were the assignments of Villa Medici's residents. Completed in early January, they were briefly exhibited in Rome before being sent to Paris to be judged by the Academie des Beaux-Arts. Due to the time it took for judging and postal delays, students often received feedback only in November or December; just a few weeks before submitting a more advanced phase of their work.

Prosper Morey's submissions were the following (the year being when the work was sent, the work having been done mostly the year before):

- First-year submission (1833) : Temple of Mars Ultor and restoration project of Forum of Augustus;
- Second-year submission (1834) : Study of details for the Panthéon of Agrippa, the triangular forum in Pompeii and the Temple of Peace in Paestum;
- Third-year submissions (1835) : Arches of Titus, Constantin and Septimius Severus, Temple of Vesta (Tivoli), temple of Hercule in Cori;
- Fourth-year submission (1836) : Project for the restoration of Trajan's Forum;
- Fifth-year submission (1837) : Pantheon project.

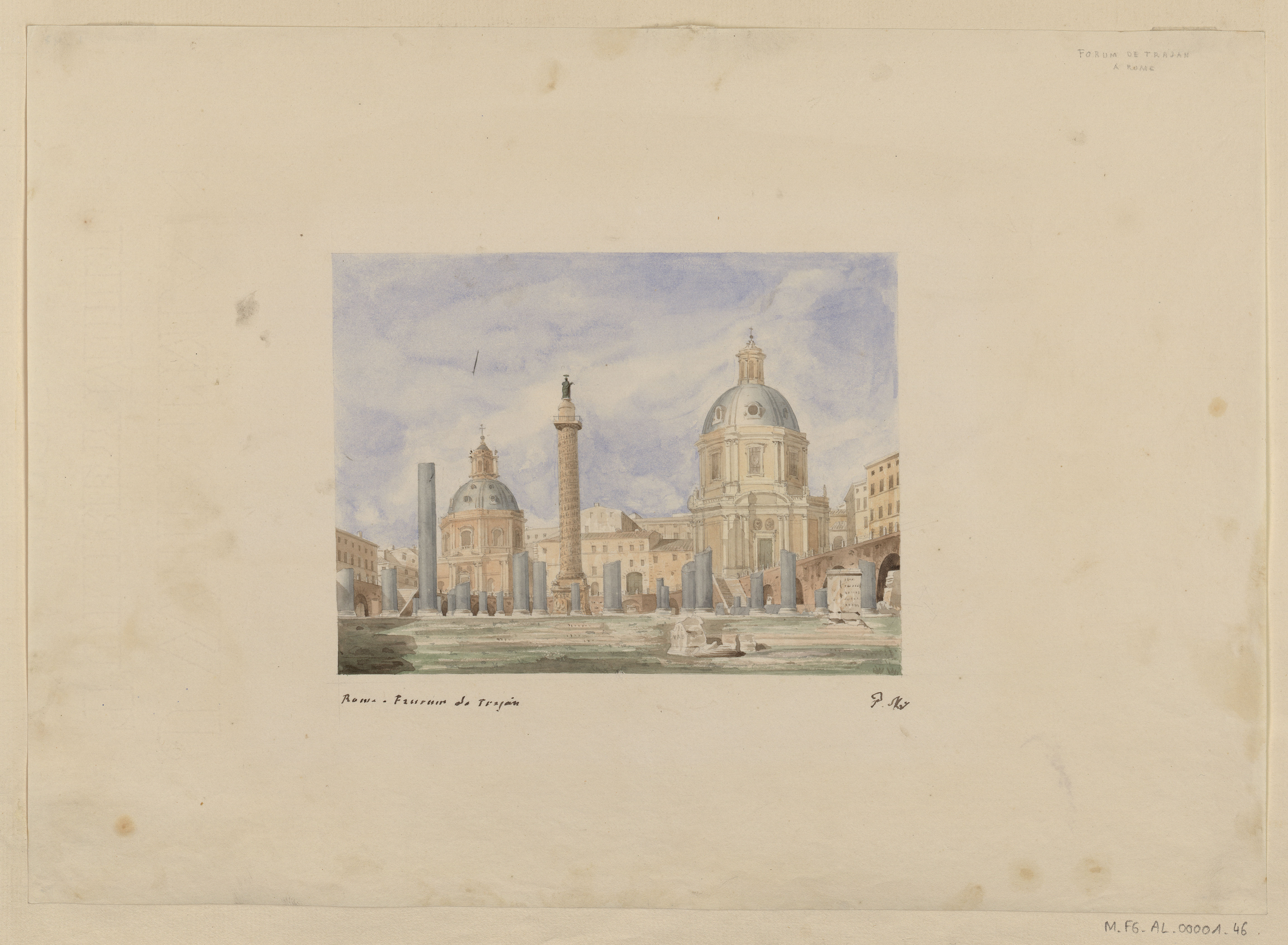
Trajan Forum in Rome by Prosper Morey

Among his submissions, his fourth-year work on the Trajan Forum remains one of Prosper Morey's most ambitious projects. The area covered is considerable, spanning an area of 300 meters by 180 meters. In 1835, Prosper Morey submitted a total of 14 drawings regarding the ornamentation and proposals for the restoration of the main monuments. His work marks the earliest representations of the ruins since the beginning of their excavations, ordered by Napoleon in 1811. The first to devote his submissions to the forum was Jean-Baptiste Lesueur in 1824. These two submissions allow for comparison and correction of certain errors made by Lesueur or Morey. Indeed, the architect from Nancy restores two apses to the Ulpia Basilica, which Lesueur had omitted. However, the student draws all the entrances in an identical manner, whereas Lesueur, correctly, attributes only four columns to the central entrances.

Morey's submissions on the Trajan Forum provoked various reactions. On one hand, this remarkable work received recognition in the collection of atlases of restorations of ancient monuments. On the other hand, a number of criticisms are expressed by Etienne-Jean Delécluze in the Journal des débats. The architect then complained to the nephew of the journalist : Eugène Viollet-le-Duc.

Despite this remarkable piece, Morey's submissions were not particularly distinguished by their originality but were highly appreciated by the judges. In every aspect, he proved to be a model and diligent resident. For example, he reproduced some sketches made by his fellow workers such as Alphonse Goujon. Copy was one of the best ways to become and learn to be an architect.

== Travels abroad ==
Many travels abroad happened during Prosper Morey's career. In addition to his journey in Rome, in 1838, Morey joined the archaeological mission in Greece and Asia Minor led by Raoul Rochette. In 1846, he participated in the creation of the École française d'Athènes.

Prosper Morey conducted numerous archaeological and architectural travels during which, as his fellows, he would sketch many buildings he visited. These sketches, blue prints or views were put together in portfolios. Prosper Morey consulted these references throughout his career.

The Morey's portfolio was given to Bibliothèque municipale de Nancy after his death in 1886. It contains 19 albums with sketches and studies both from his submissions from Rome as a student and from his travels in Rome's area, in Italy and Middle East. Some sketches have probably disappear as there are very few from Middle East despite Morey's trip from May to August in 1838.

=== Morey in Pompeii ===
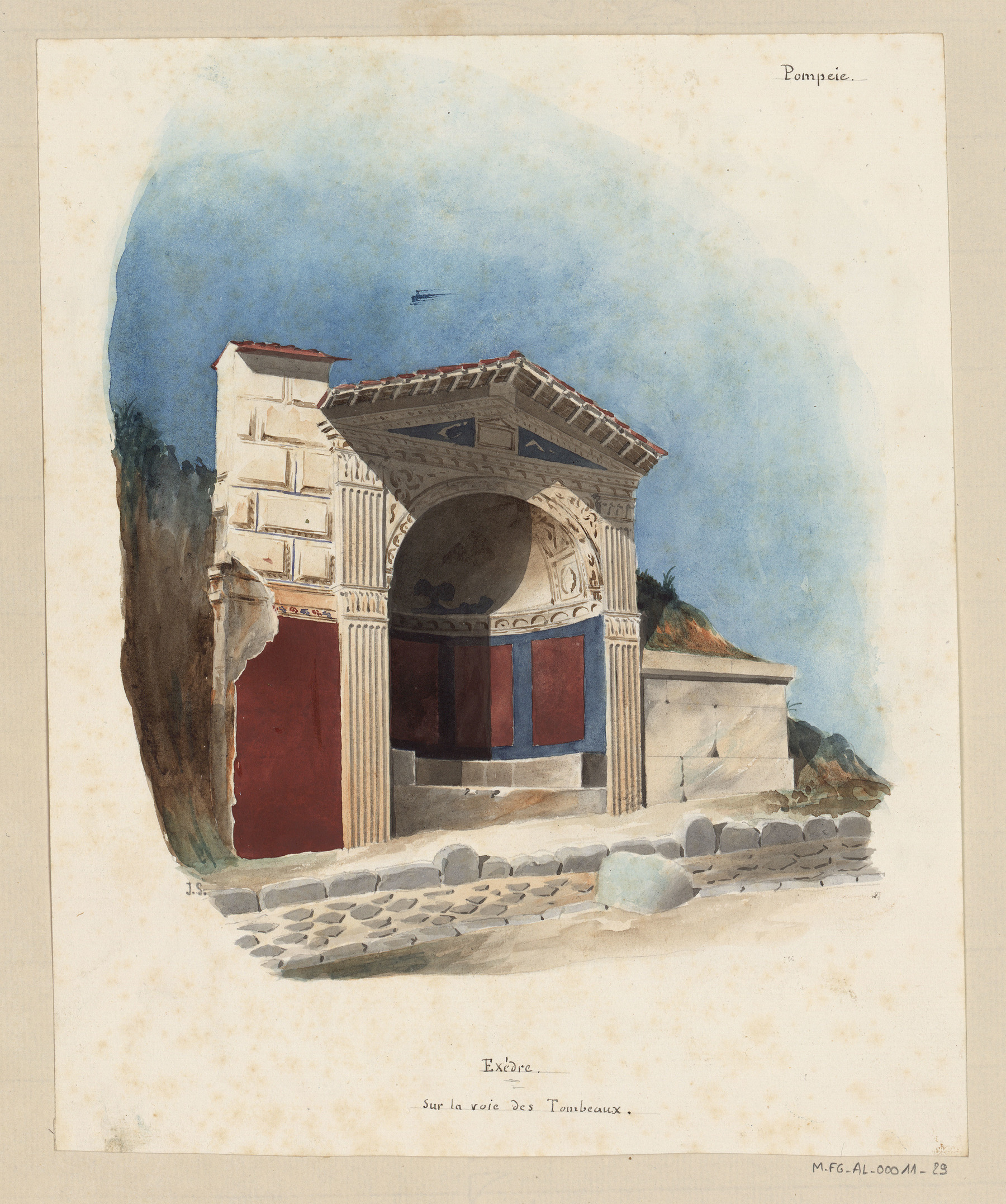
Drawing by Prosper Morey of the ruins of Pompeii

Prosper Morey was among the first to visit and document the ruins of Pompeii which he visited twice. First in 1833 during his second year as a student at the Villa Medicis. Then in 1838 after his Greek expedition.

At that time, only a quarter of the city's surface had been excavated. Morey possessed great talent for observing and rendering architectural details and decorations. He provided striking and fresh views of the frescoes in numerous Pompeian villas such as « the black bedroom villa » which he was the first to draw, the « Ariane's villa », the « Hunting villa », the « Salluste villa », or the « Pansa villa ». He also sketched many elevations, architectural pieces, columns and some public buildings such as thermal spa and the small theatre. Between 1833 and 1834, the architect had done 35 Pompeian sketchs. They are all in volume XV of his portfolio.

Over a hundred of his drawings are kept at the bibliothèque municipale de Nancy. Many were retouched with painting when Morey came back to Paris. These sketches are very important to the knowledge about Pompeii. They give precise information on this famous archeological site from the beginning of the 19th century.

=== Other travels in Italy ===
Students were encouraged to travel in Italy to refine their taste with perfect ancient models, but they also showed interest in medieval and Renaissance architecture.

Morey traveled to Sicily with Victor Baltard. There, he met Viollet-le-Duc again; Palermo and, especially, the Cathedral of Messina received much of his attention. He was also seen in Naples and Venice, documenting elevations and details of the Doge's Palace.

=== Archeological mission in Greece and Asia Minor ===
In 1838, Prosper Morey joined the archaeological mission in Greece and Asia Minor led by Désirée Raoul Rochette as architect and drawer. During three months, he was in charge of drawing antic ruins from Athens, Aegina and some of the Cyclades islands visited such as Syros, Delos, Milos, Mykonos and Santorini.

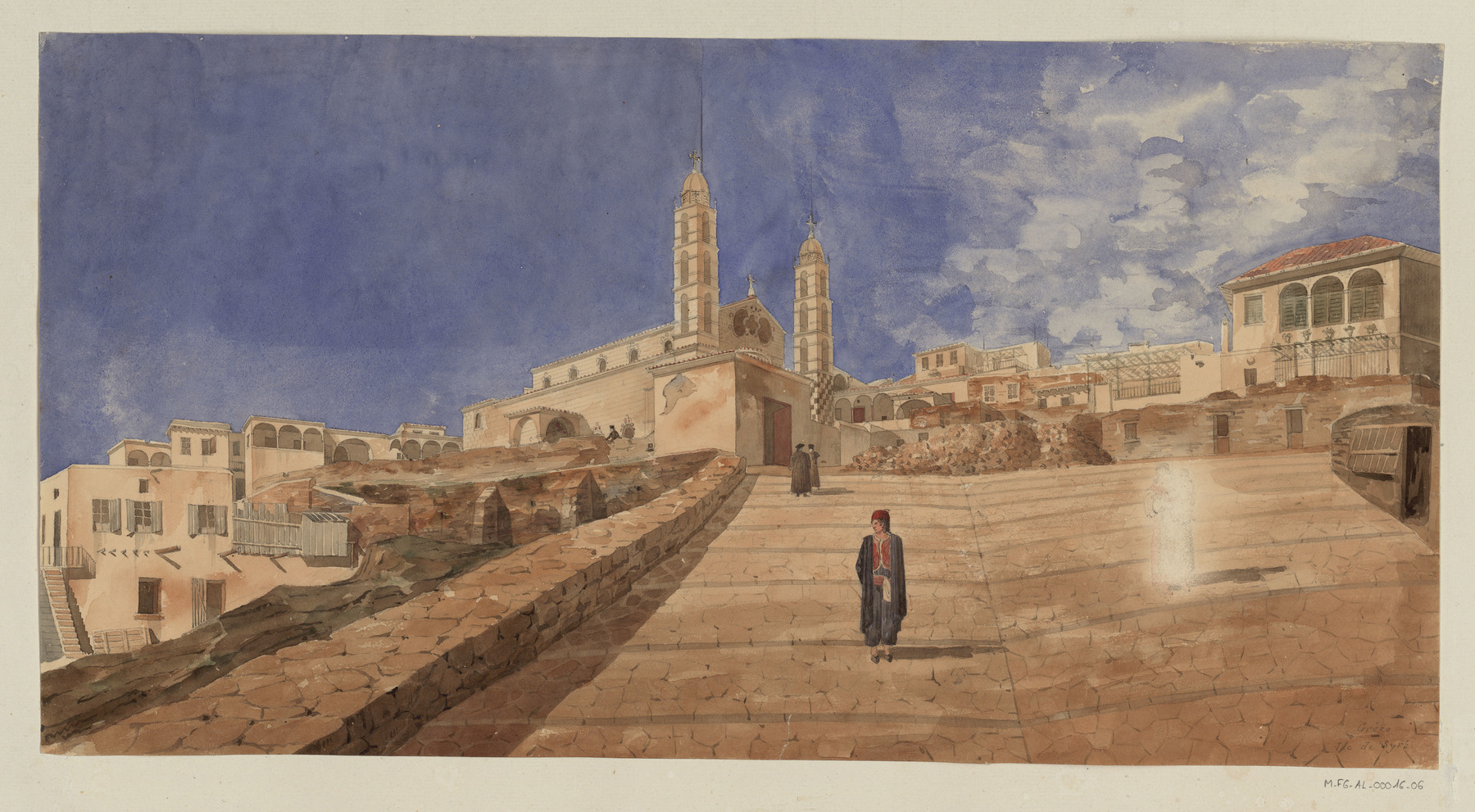
Syros island view by Prosper Morey

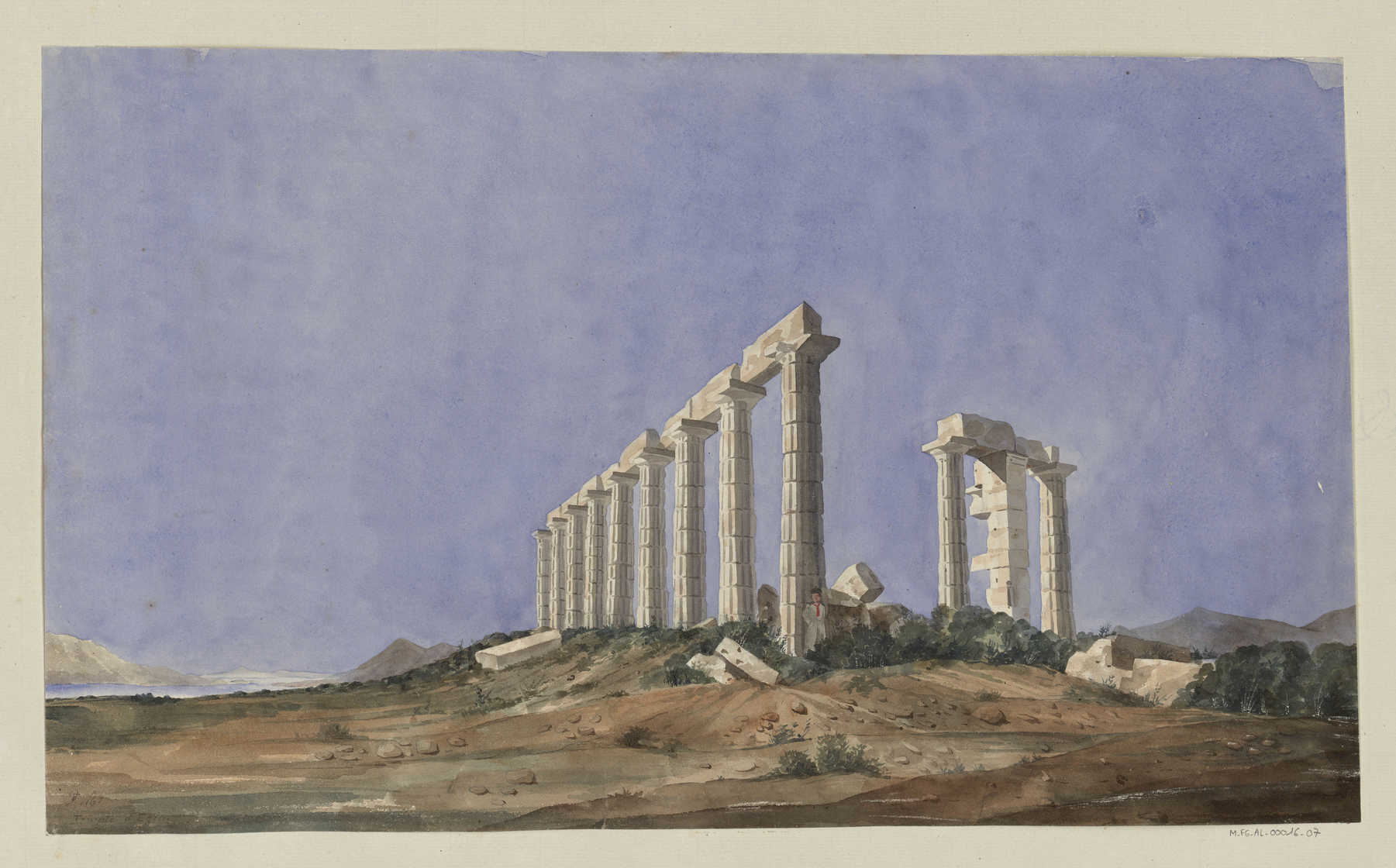
Egine temple view by Prosper Morey around 1838

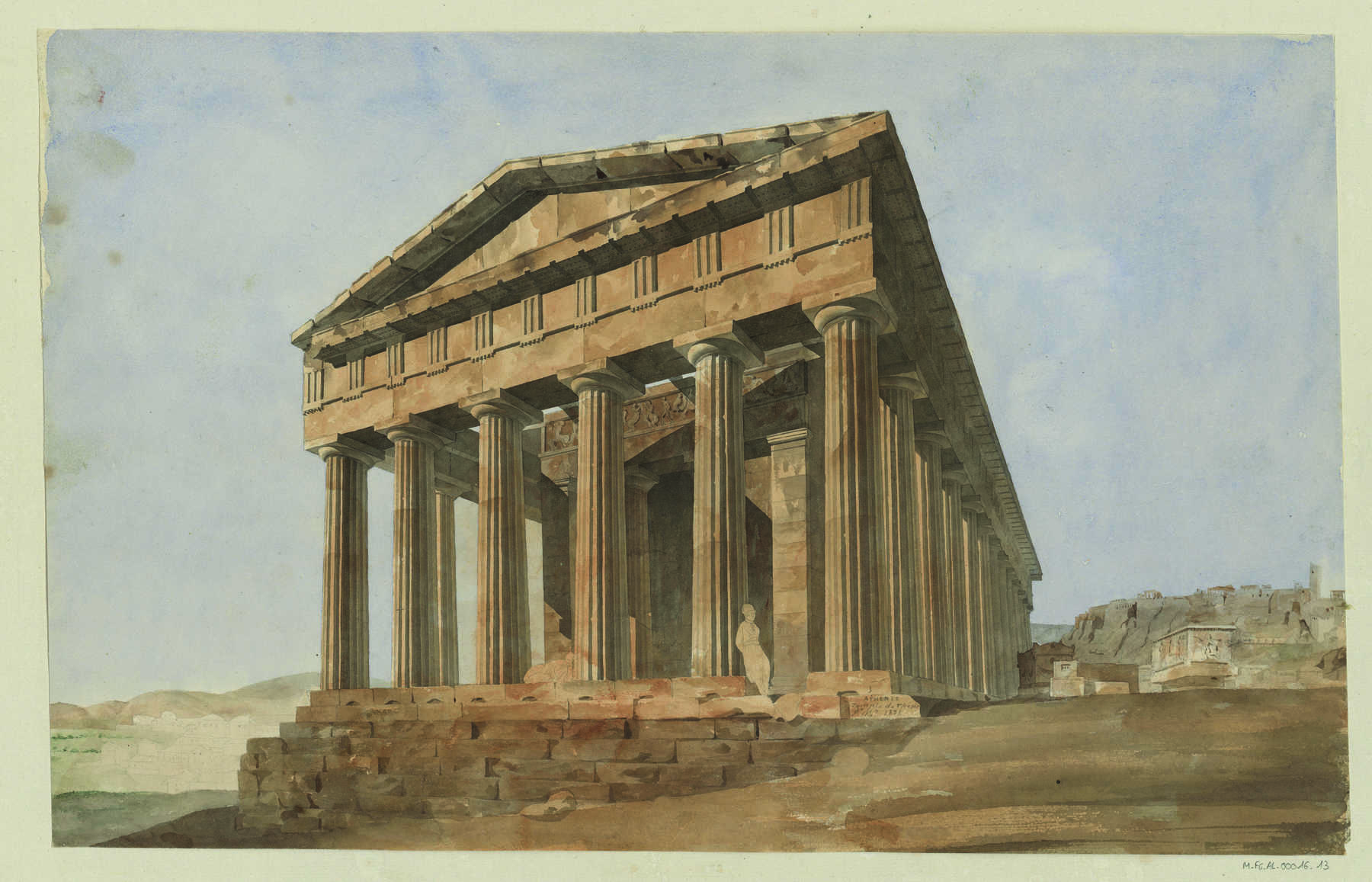
Thésée's temple view by Prosper Morey around 1838

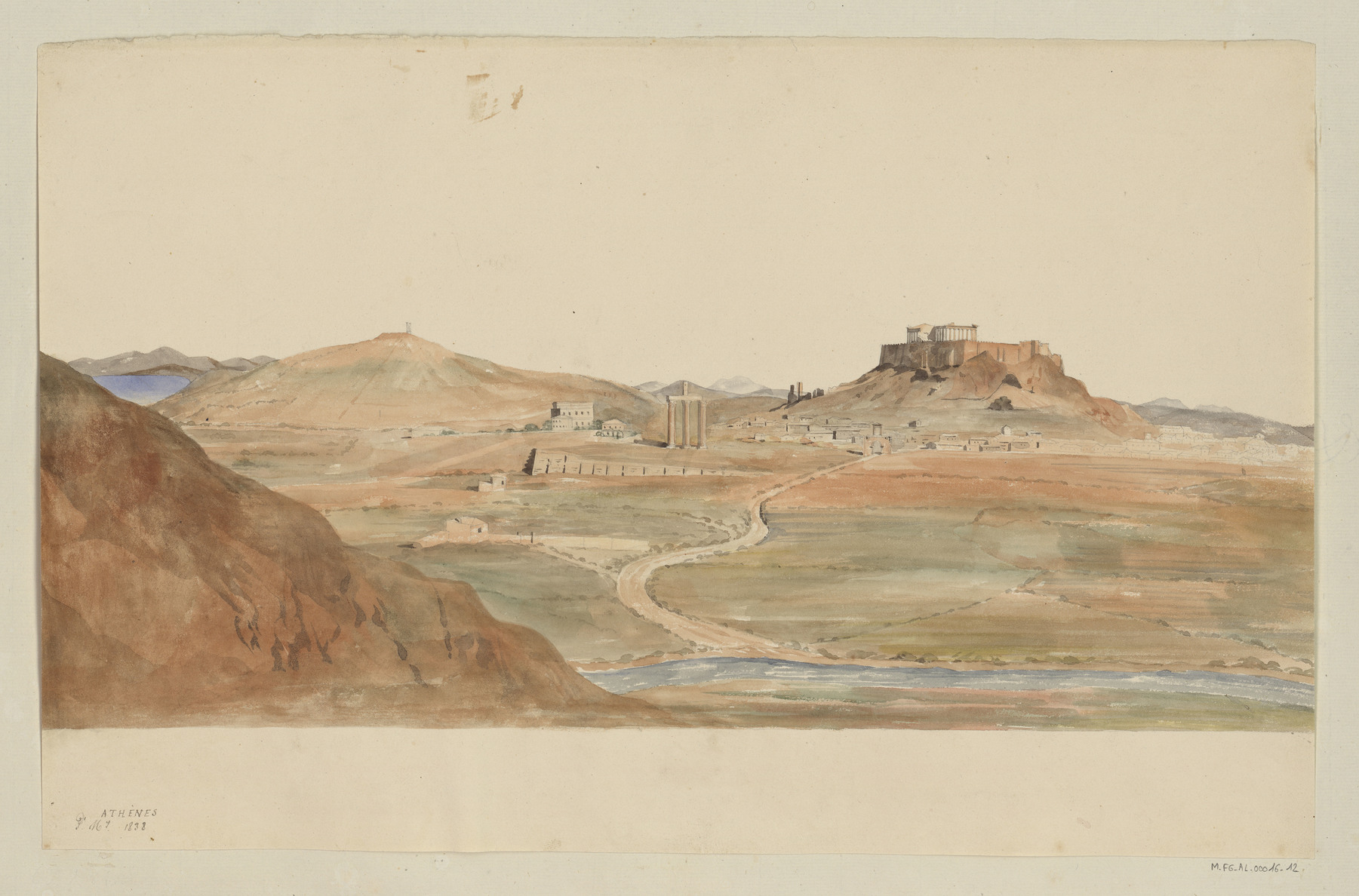
Athens view by Prosper Morey around 1838

In August 1838, Morey and Raoul-Rouchette traveled to Asia Minor, to the Troad, with the aim of obtaining from the Ottoman Empire the transfer of the bas-reliefs from the temple of Athena in Assos to France, as well as to search tor the ruins of Troy. They were successful and obtained authorization from Governor Mehmet Rechid Pasha to transfer ownership of the bas-reliefs to the Louvre.

Additionally, they purportedly identified the entrance gates to the mythical city of Troy in the valley of the Scamander. In his reception speech at the Académie de Stanislas in 1850, later published under the title "Archaeological Research in the Troad", Morey recounts that a shepherd led them into the valley of the Scamander, where they recognized the landscapes described by Homer in the Iliad, specifically citing the distances between mountain peaks and river plains. Upon their return from the Troad, they stayed in Constantinople for a few days, where Morey explored the city and made drawings, notably of the tomb of Suleiman the Magnificent.

The archaeological mission led by Raoul-Rouchette is one the many scientific missions of that time. Scientists and artists would map the fauna and flora and conduct archaeological excavations. The publications of the work from these various missions led to the establishment of the French School of Athens in 1846.

== Career ==
Back to France around 1840, Prosper Morey settled in Paris and married Louise-Arsène-Eugénie Klein, grand-daughter of general Klein, on May 4, 1841. The couple had a daughter, Reine Mathilde, the wife of Phulpin, who was responsible for donating the entire Morey collection to the city of Nancy. He was appointed inspector of public works and expert architect for the courts. He participated in the restoration of the Abbey of Saint-Omer and the Column of the Grande Armée in Boulogne. He sought various official positions at the Ministry of Foreign Affairs, the Tuileries, Fontainebleau, and the Louvre, but did not obtain them.

In 1850, he returned to Nancy, where he was soon appointed chief architect of the city and architect of historical monuments for the Meurthe department. Author of several publications on the history of architecture in Lorraine, he became a member of the Académie de Stanislas in 1850 and a corresponding member of the Academy of Fine Arts in 1869. Regarded as an architect and a scholar, Prosper Morey studied the history of Nancy's architecture. Within the Stanislas Academy, he wrote articles on the history of Lorraine art from his appointment until his death in 1884. He showed considerable interest in the great Lorraine architects of the 18th century such as Richard Mique and Emmanuel Héré. He notably published a book on the works of Germain Boffrand titled "Recueil des oeuvres inédites de Germain Boffrand", which includes reproductions of some original drawings by Boffrand and serves as a testament to the architect's work. Sold at auction in 1920, it was acquired by the Musée Lorrain. His last written work, "Archéologie des édifices religieux de la Lorraine, avec un exposé des églises de Nancy, par Pr. Morey, architect, membre de l'Institut" was never published, and the manuscript remains to this day in the municipal library of Nancy.

== Death and posterity ==
Prosper Morey died on July 5, 1886, and was buried in the Préville cemetery in Nancy. In his eulogy, delivered on July 8, 1886, Modeste Chassignet, a member the Stanislas Academy, speaks of the loss to the learned society of "one of its esteemed elders". He left behind a personal collection and professional documents. Part of his work, including volumes of drawings from his travels in Italy and Greece, was donated to the municipal library of Nancy by his daughter. This donation consists of 19 compilations containing 790 drawings.

Though he was well-known in his lifetime, as evidenced by the numerous tributes paid to him upon his death, he gradually faded from public memory. Indeed, Claire Haquet interprets this detachment as a consequence of the changing architectural tastes at the end of the 1890s.

== Architectural works ==
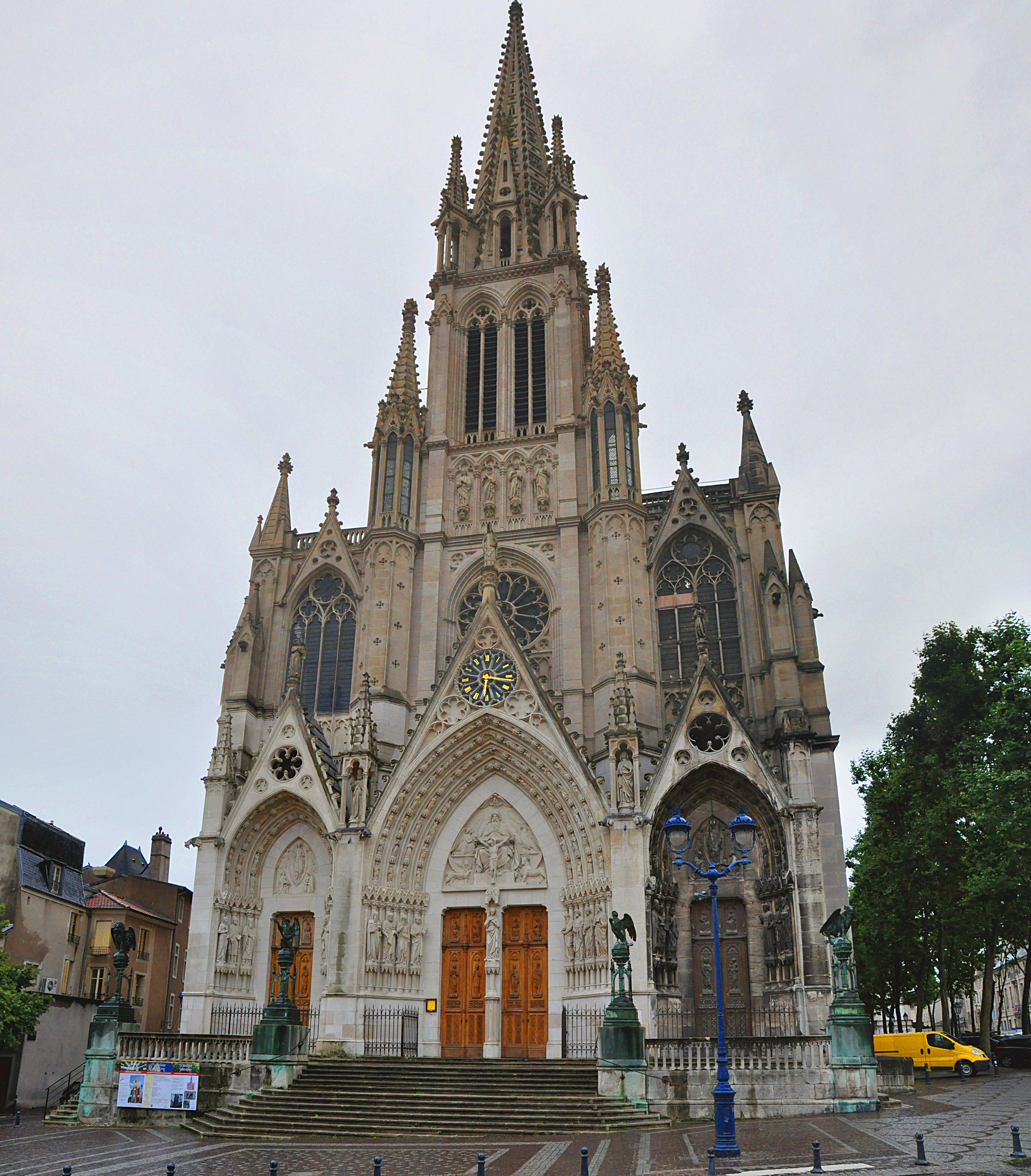
Saint-Epvre basilica in Nancy

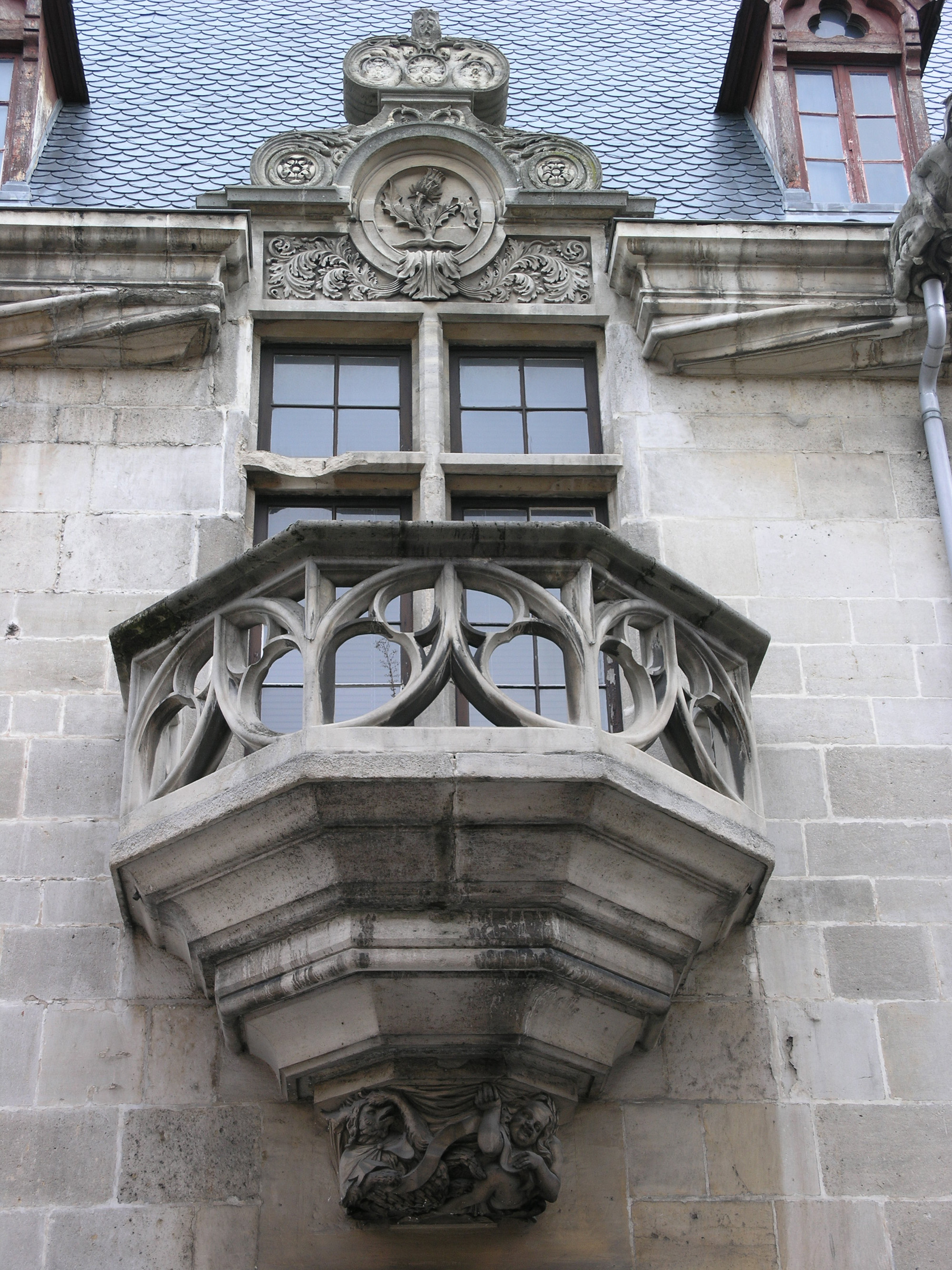
Restoration of the Palace of the Dukes of Lorraine by Prosper Morey

Neo-Gothic style representative, Prosper Morey built numerous structures for the city and is particularly famous for the reconstruction of the Basilica of Saint-Epvre on which a commemorative plaque was added in 1916.

The buildings he worked on in Nancy are the following:

- Covered market in Nancy in 1849,
- Saint-Fiacre church (from 1853 to 1855),
- Asnée castle in Villers-lès-Nancy in 1858,
- University palace (from 1858 to 1870),
- Extension of the city hall of Nancy in 1862,
- Basilica of Saint-Epvre (from 1863 to 1875),
- Park keeper's house in the Pépinière Park (1867 – destroyed by arson),
- Former School of Painting and Drawing (now North Wing of the Musée Lorrain) in 1871,
- Music kiosk in the Pépinière Park (1874),
- Saint-Nicolas church in Nancy (from 1874 to 1883),
- Extension of the Lycée de Nancy (1877),
- Monumental façade of Place Vaudémont with statues by Eugène Laurent,
- Central hospital in 1883.

He was also solicited for buildings outside Nancy :

- Charlot-Lung castle in Moussey (1852–1861)
- Reconstruction (1866–1869) of the Senones Abbey destroyed in 1809 by fire,
- Nursing home hospital in Senones.

As an architect of historical monuments, he contributed to numerous restorations such as:

- the Palace of the Dukes of Lorraine
- Haroué Castle.

Prosper Morey also practiced lithography and drawing. Alexandre Falguière executed the funerary monument of Dom Calmet for the abbey church of Senones in 1869 based on his drawings.

== Publications ==
Among his writings:

- Digitized manuscript from the Libraries of Nancy, Ms. 1810: Morey, Prosper (1805–1886), The Archaeology of Ancient Religious Buildings in Lorraine with an Overview of the Demolished Churches of Nancy, 1846/1886. Read online
- Prosper Morey, Archaeological Research in the Troad or Fragment of a Journey Made During the Year1838, Nancy, Grimblot et Vve Raybois, 1854, 19 p.
- Prosper Morey, Biographical Notice on the Life and Works of Emmanuel Héré de Corny, First Architect to His Majesty Stanislas, King of Poland, Duke of Lorraine and Bar, Memoir of the Stanislas Academy, Nancy, Printing Press of Ve Raybois, 1863
- Prosper Morey, Biogrophical Notice on the Life and Works of Father François Derand, Lorraine Architect, Memoir of Stanislas Academy, Nancy, Printing Presse of Ve Raybois, 1867
- Prosper Morey, Richard Mique, Architect to Stanislas, King of Poland, and to the Queen Marie Antoinette, Memoir of Stanislas Academy, Nancy, Printing Press of Ve Raybois, 1868

== Distinctions ==
- Knight of the Legion of Honour in 1860,
- Knight of the Order of Franz Joseph in 1867,
- Cross of the Order of Saint Gregory the Great in 1870,
- Officer's Palms of the Academy in 1872.

In Nancy, a street near the train station, rue Morey, is named after him.

== See also ==
=== Bibliography ===
- Hubert Elie, Un architecte nancéien : Prosper Morey (1805–1886), Nancy, 1964.
- Roma Antiqua : Envois des architectes français (1788–1924), Paris, École nationale supérieure des beaux-arts, 1985, p. 163 et n^{o} 85–90.
- Voyages en Italie et en Grèce de Prosper Morey (1805–1886), architecte lorrain, Nancy, Musée des Beaux-Arts, 1990.
- "Morey, Prosper", dans Répertoire des architectes nés ou actifs dans les Vosges : 1800–1940, Épinal, Archives départementales des Vosges, 2007 (ISBN 978-2-86088-052-7), p. 41.
- Annie Verger et Gabriel Verger, Dictionnaire biographique des pensionnaires de l'Académie de France à Rome 1666–1968, t. II, Dijon, l'Échelle de Jacob, 2011, 1654 p. ({{ISBN}978-2-35968-024-9}}), p. 1109-1110.
- Claire Haquet, « Les jeunes années d'un architecte : Prosper Morey (1827–1850) », Le Pays lorrain, vol. 94, n^{o} 2, juin 2013, p. 139–146
- Claire Haquet, « Prosper Morey », dans Isabelle Guyot-Bachy et Jean-Christophe Blanchard (dir.), Dictionnaire de la Lorraine savante, Metz : Éditions des Paraiges, 2022, p. 228-229.

=== External links ===
- Numerical documents from Prosper Morey files on Limédia galeries
- Ressources on art history : AGORHA, Artists of the World Online, Musée d'Orsay, Union List of Artist Names
