= Church of Saint-Nicolas, Nancy =

Church in Meurthe-et-Moselle, France

Eglise Saint-Nicolas de Nancy
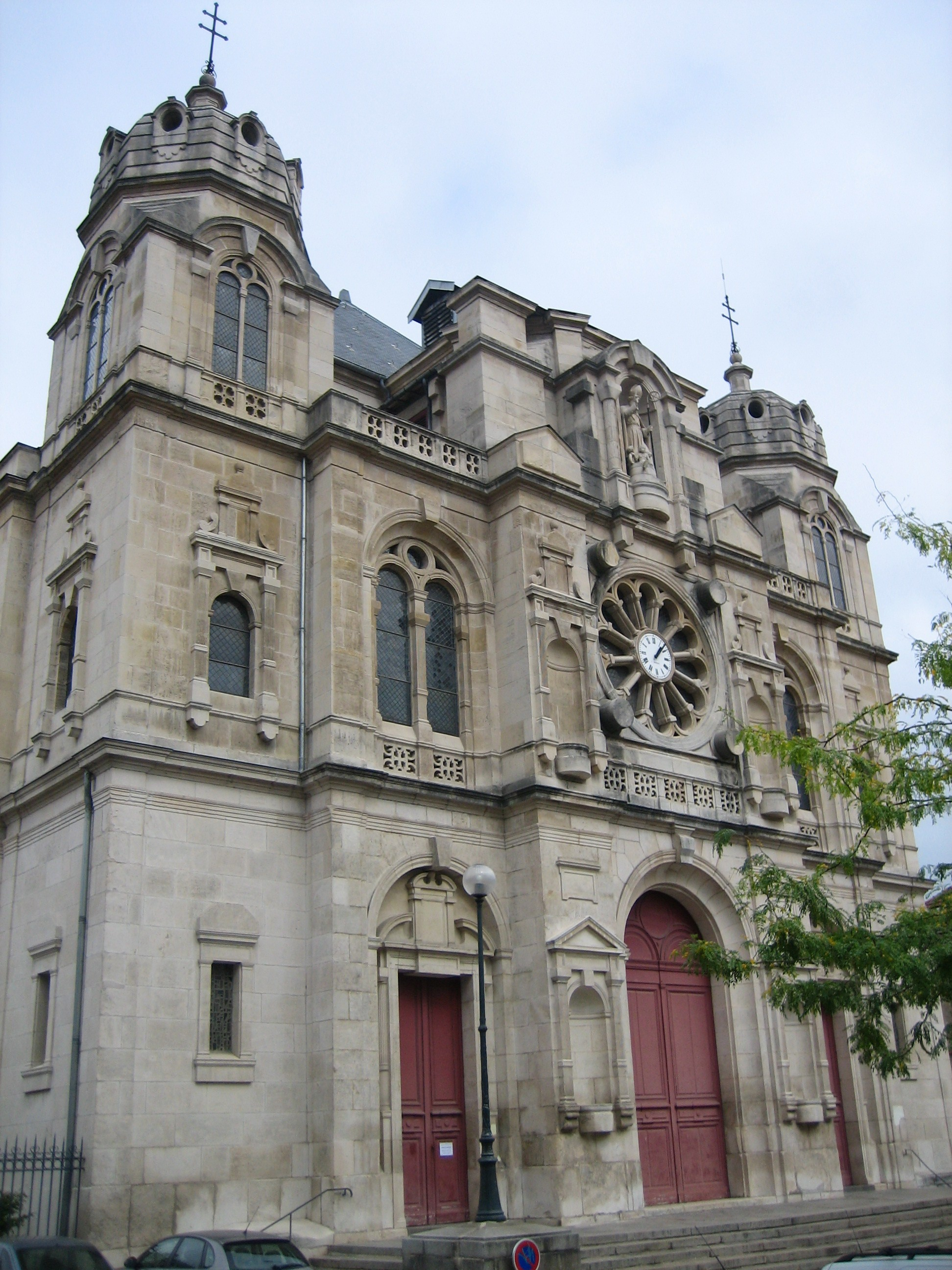

Religion
- Affiliation: Catholicism
- Province: Meurthe-et-Moselle
- Region: Lorraine

Location
- Location: Nancy
- Country: France
- Interactive map of Eglise Saint-Nicolas de Nancy
- Administration: Grand Est
- Coordinates: 48°41′15″N 6°11′10″E

Architecture
- Architect: Prosper Morey
- Style: neoRoman, classical
- Completed: 1874-1883

The Church of Saint-Nicolas is a religious building in Nancy, France, built in the 19th century by Prosper Morey for one of the three original parishes in the new town of Nancy. It is dedicated to the patron saint of Lorraine—Saint Nicholas, bishop of Myre.

== Location ==
The church is located on No. 47 rue Charles-III.

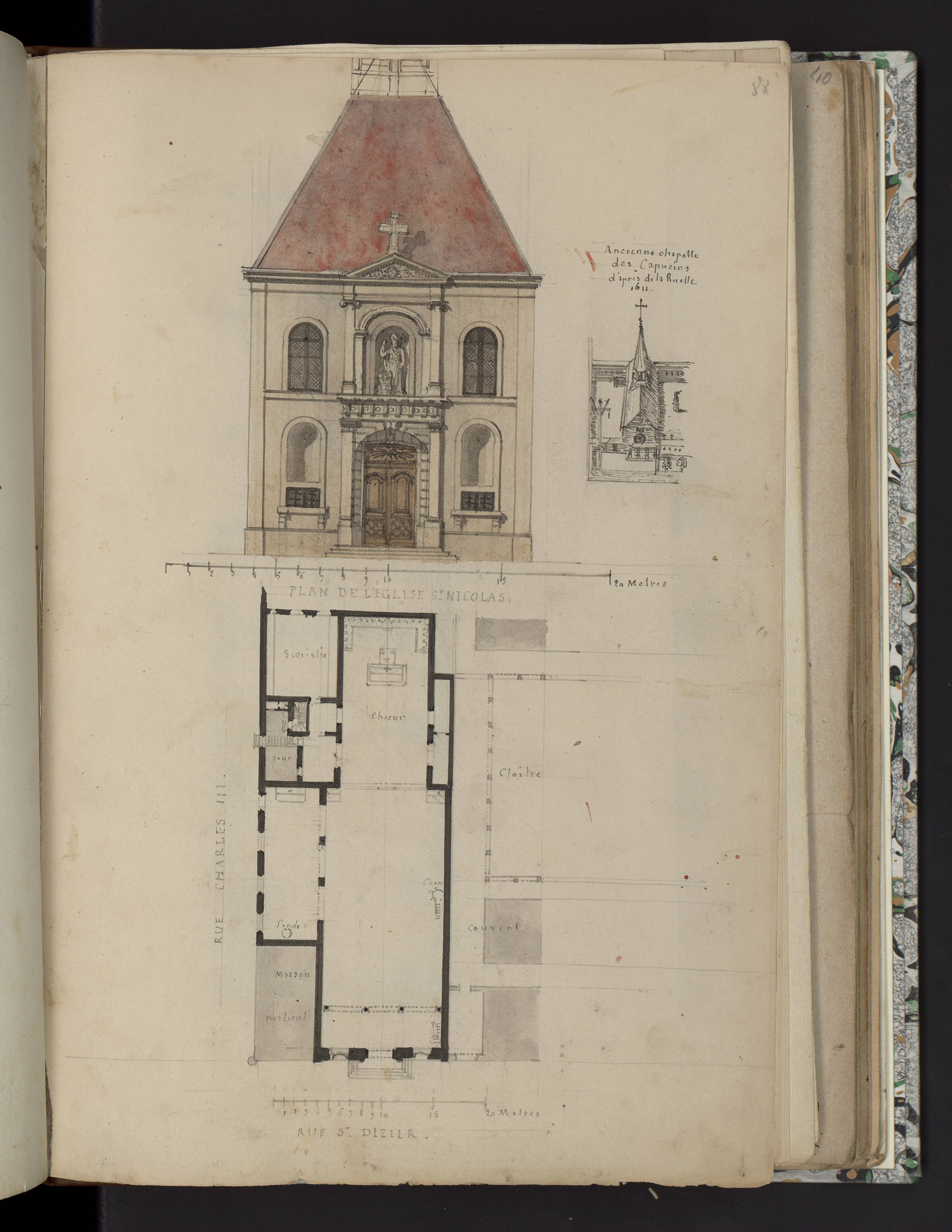
drawing of the church by Prosper Morey, the architect

== Architecture ==
The church is of a Renaissance style, breaking away from the neogothic tradition dear to Prosper Morey, but it remains unfinished. The organ, designed by the organ builder Henri Didier, from Epinal, is dated from 1897.
