= Architecture of Paris =

The city of Paris has notable examples of architecture from the Middle Ages to the 21st century. It was the birthplace of the Gothic style, and has important monuments of the French Renaissance, Classical revival, the Flamboyant style of the reign of Napoleon III, the Belle Époque, and the Art Nouveau style. The great Exposition Universelle (1889) and 1900 added Paris landmarks, including the Eiffel Tower and Grand Palais. In the 20th century, the Art Deco style of architecture first appeared in Paris, and Paris architects also influenced the postmodern architecture of the second half of the century.

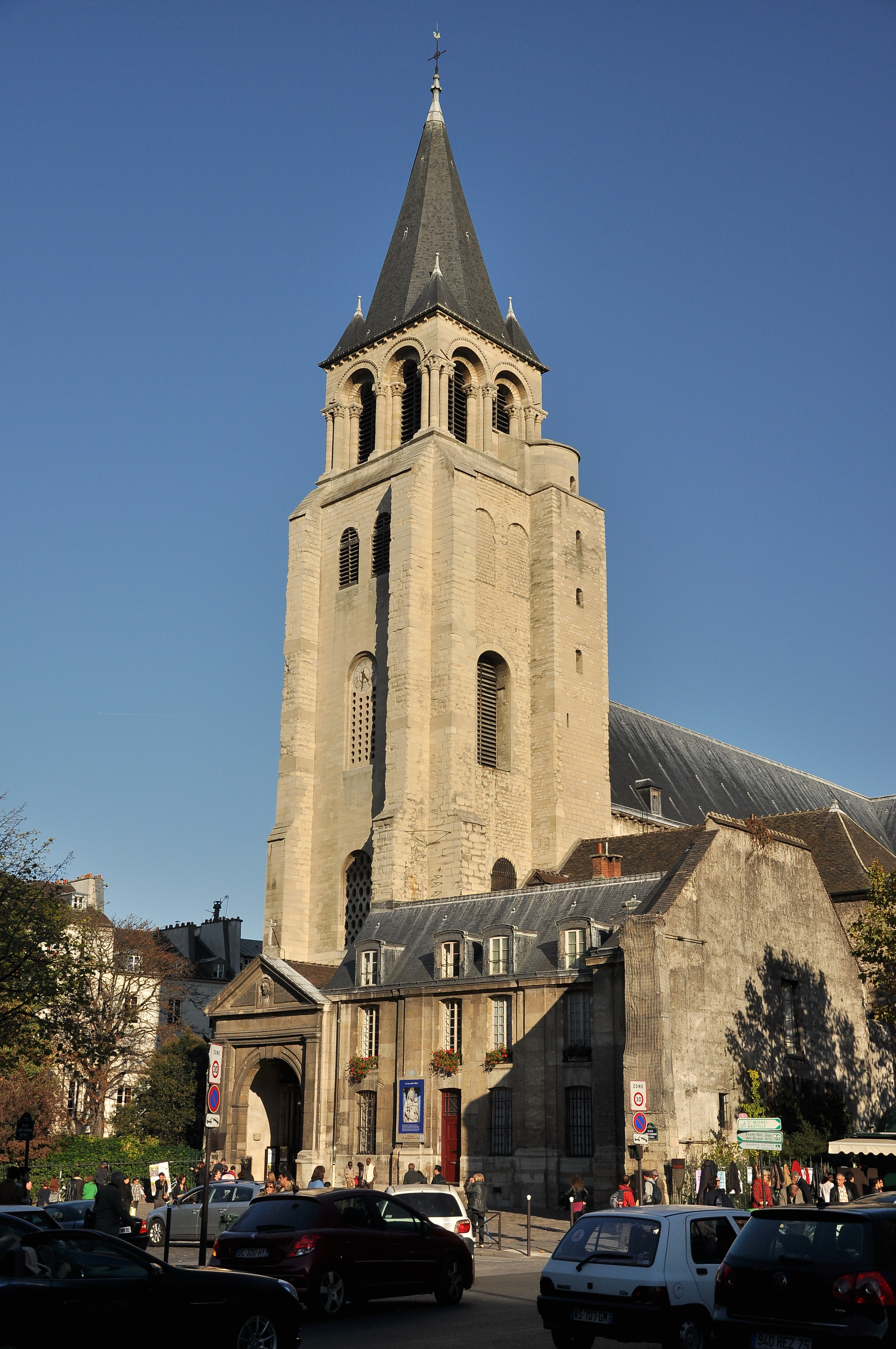
The Abbey of Saint-Germain-des-Prés (990–1160)

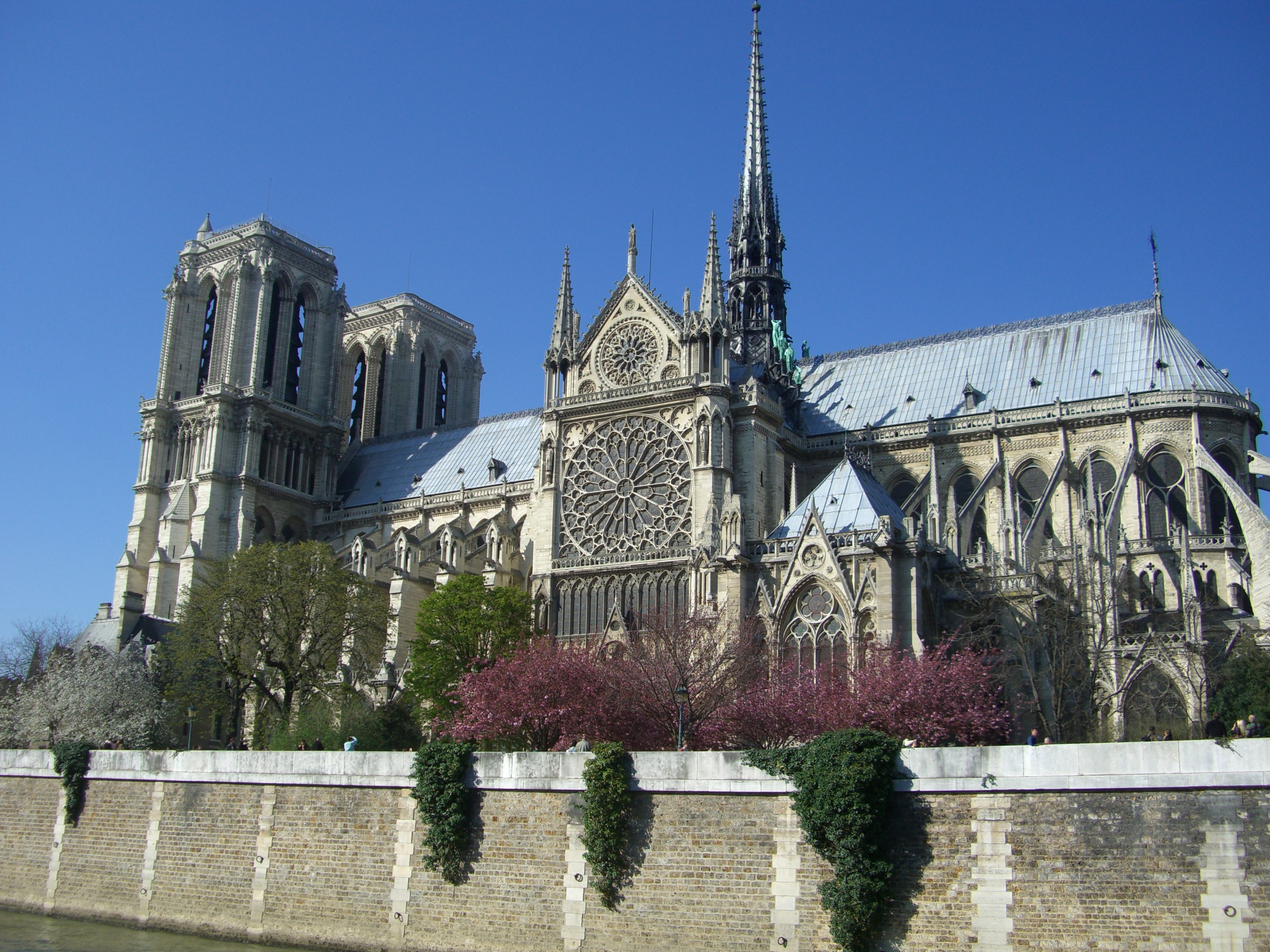
Cathedral of Notre-Dame de Paris (1160–1230)

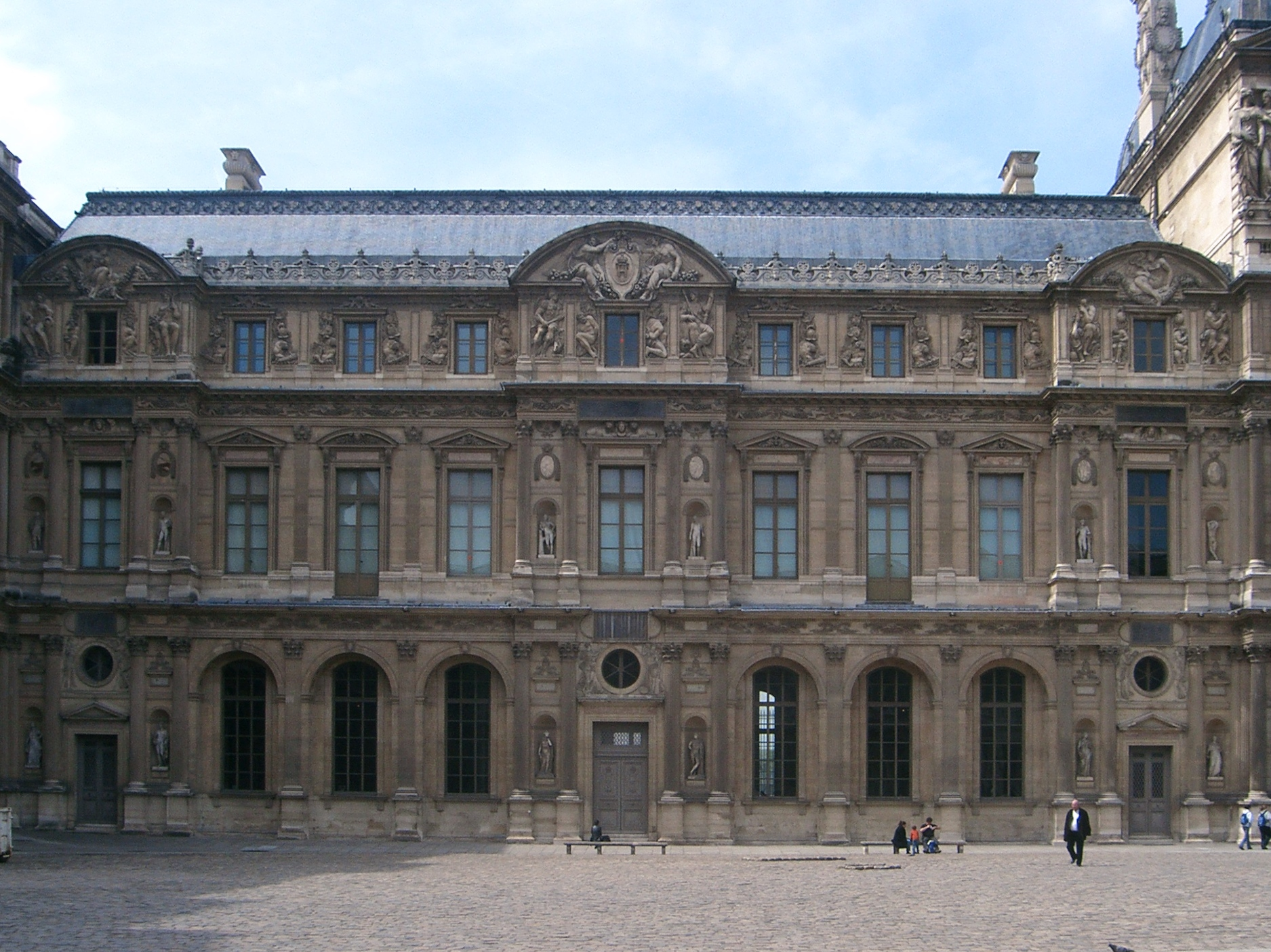
Renaissance wing of the Louvre (1546), by Pierre Lescot

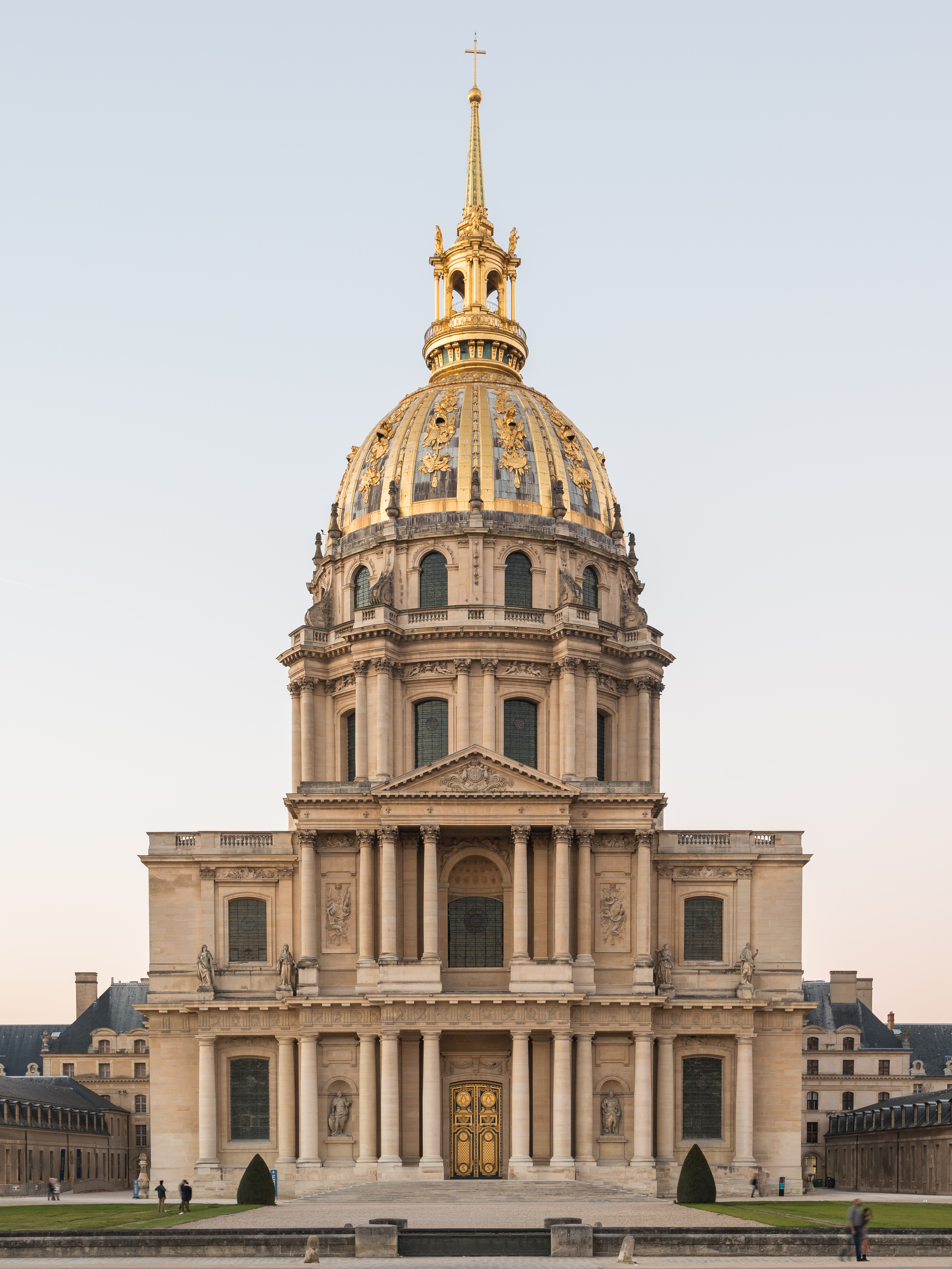
Dome of Les Invalides (1677–1706) by Jules Hardouin-Mansart

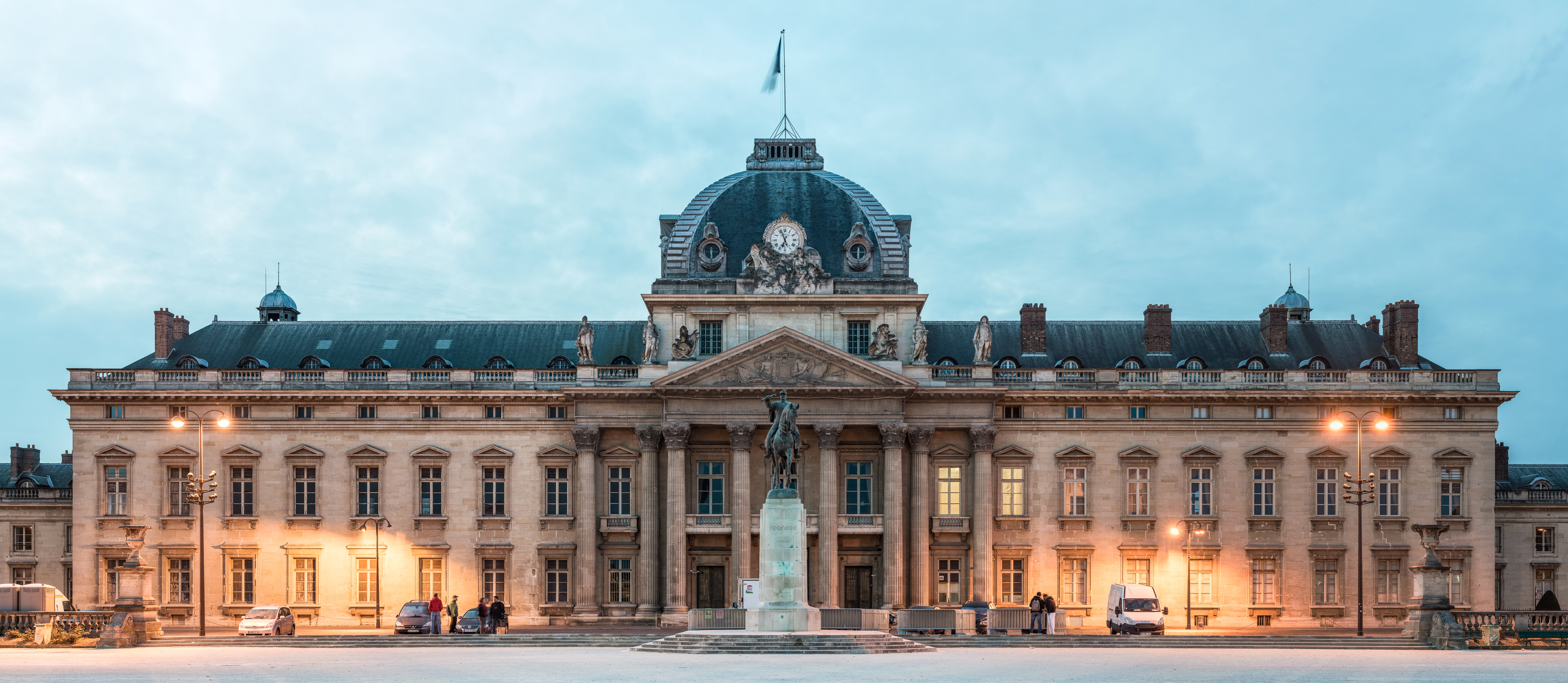
The École Militaire (1751–1780) by Ange-Jacques Gabriel

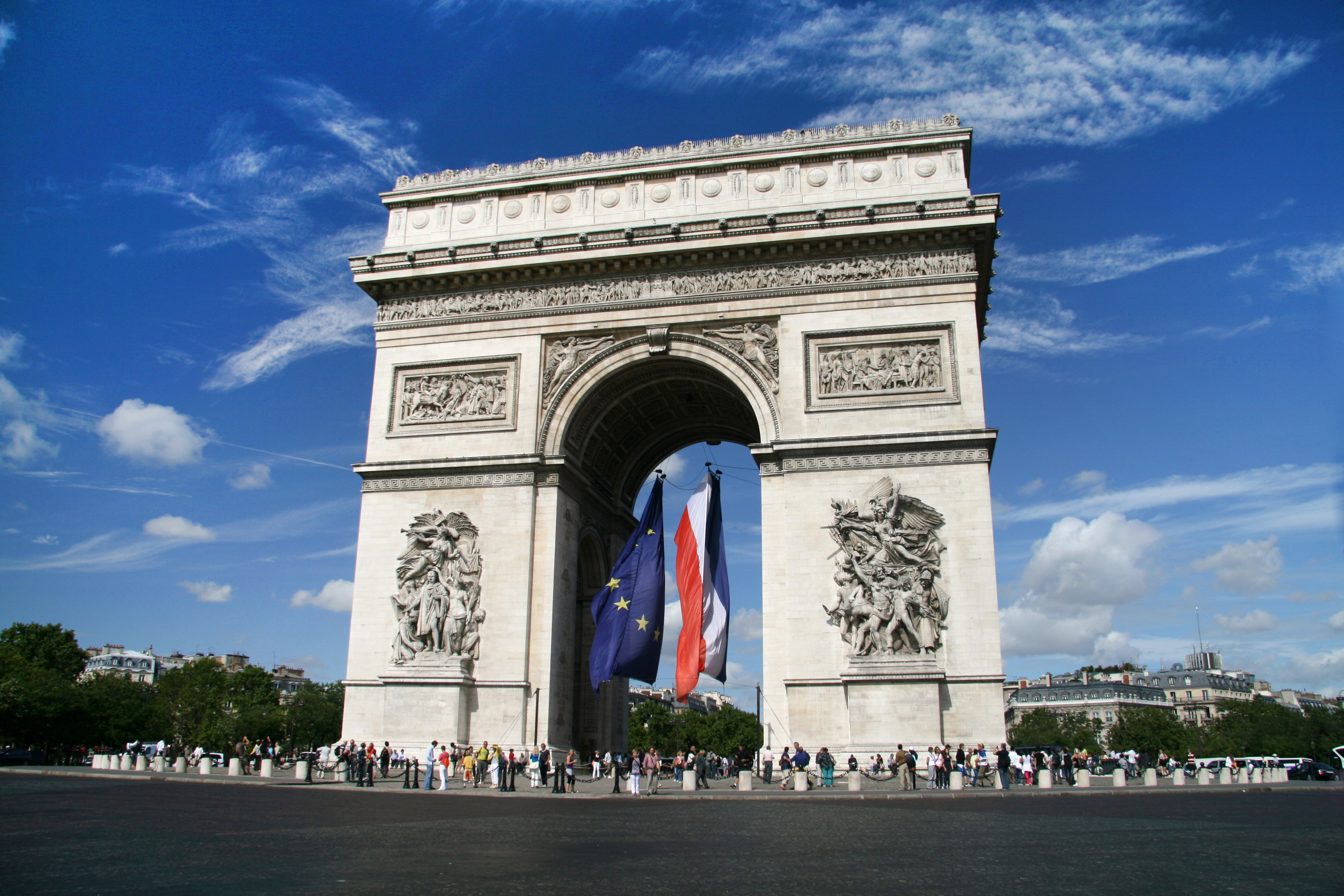
The Arc de Triomphe (1806–1836) by Jean-François Chalgrin

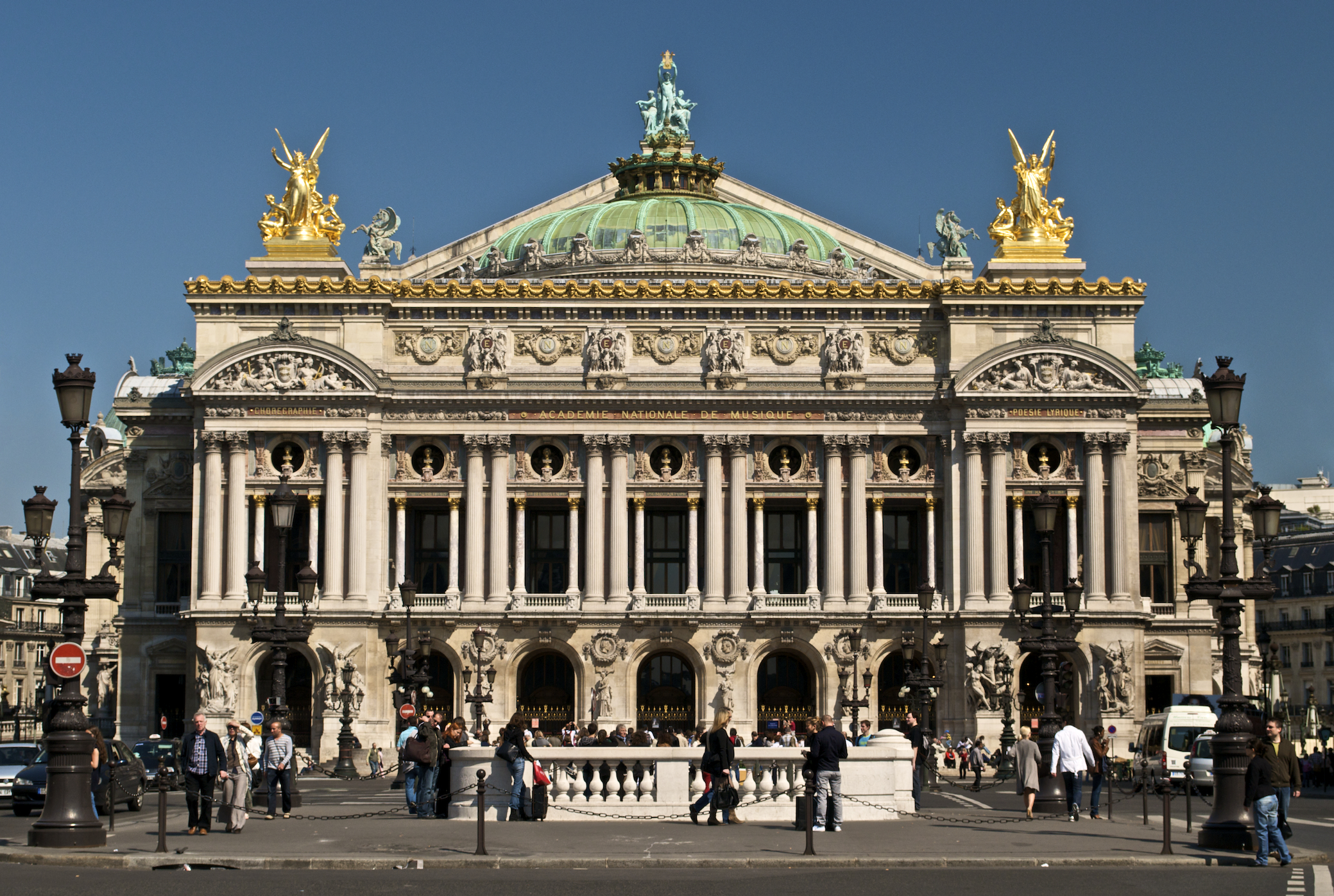
Palais Garnier (1861–1875) by Charles Garnier

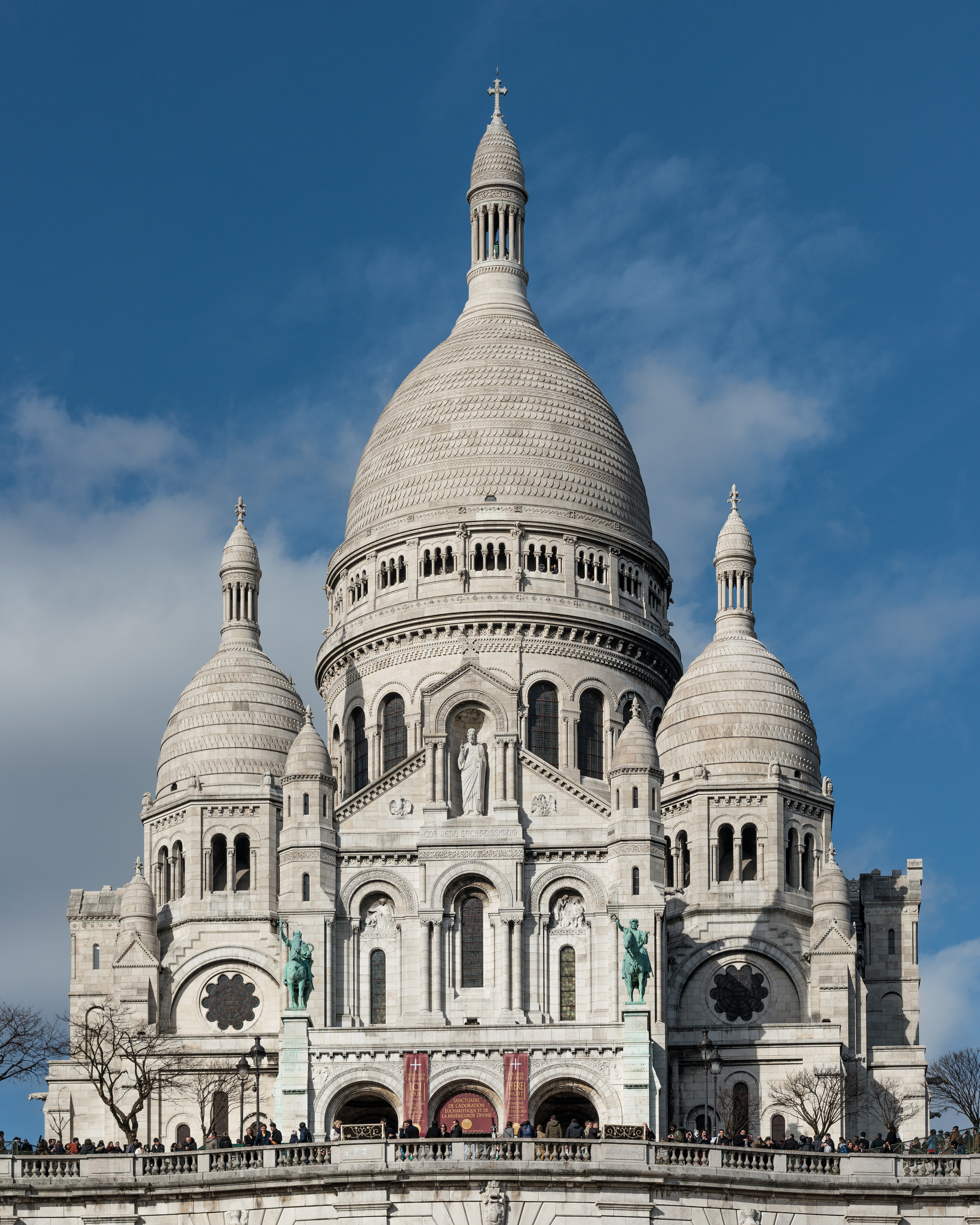
The Basilica of Sacré-Cœur (1874–1916) by Paul Abadie

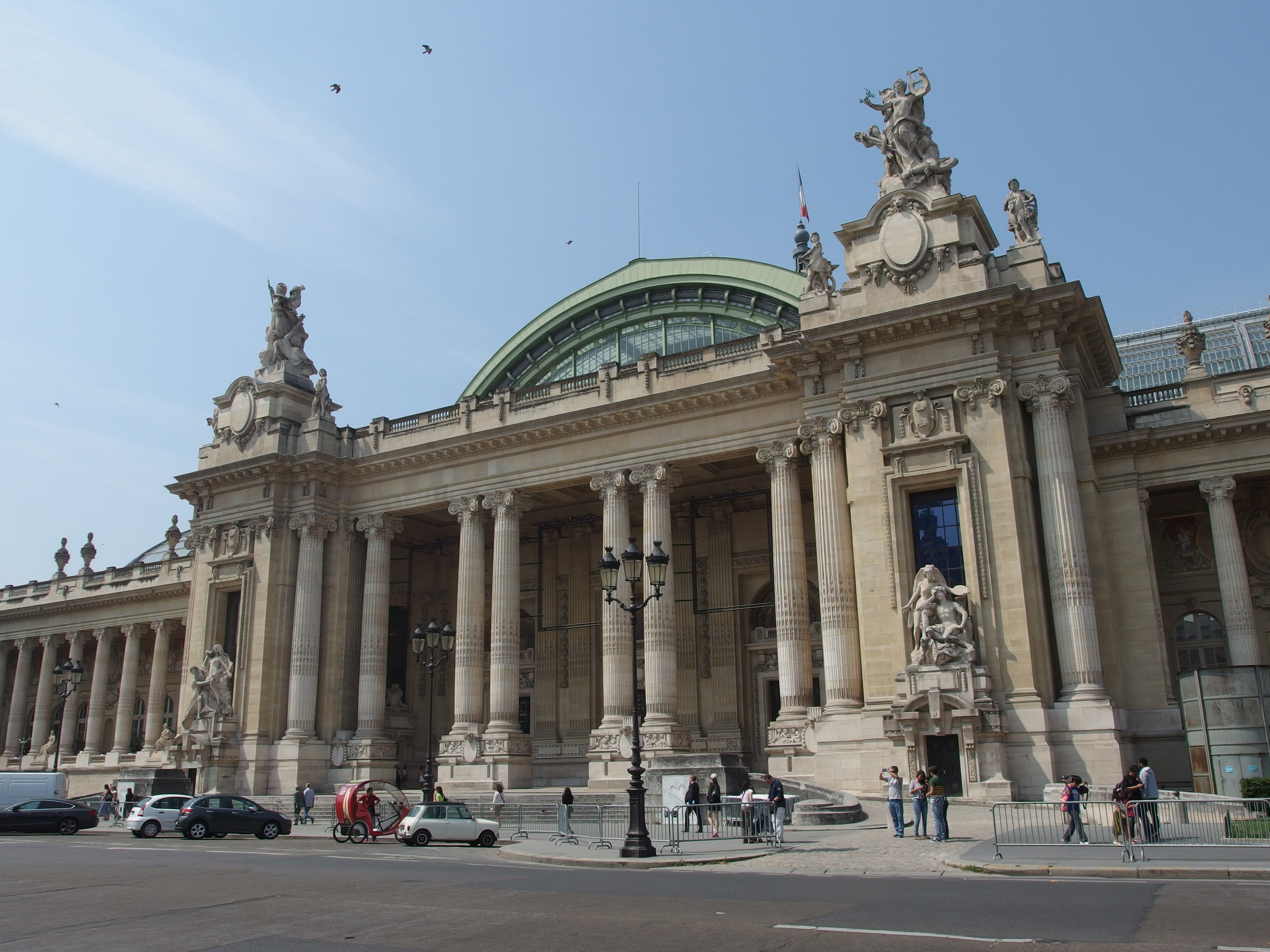
The Grand Palais (1897–1900), by Henri Deglane, Charles Girault, Albert Louvet and Albert Thomas

== Gallo-Roman architecture ==
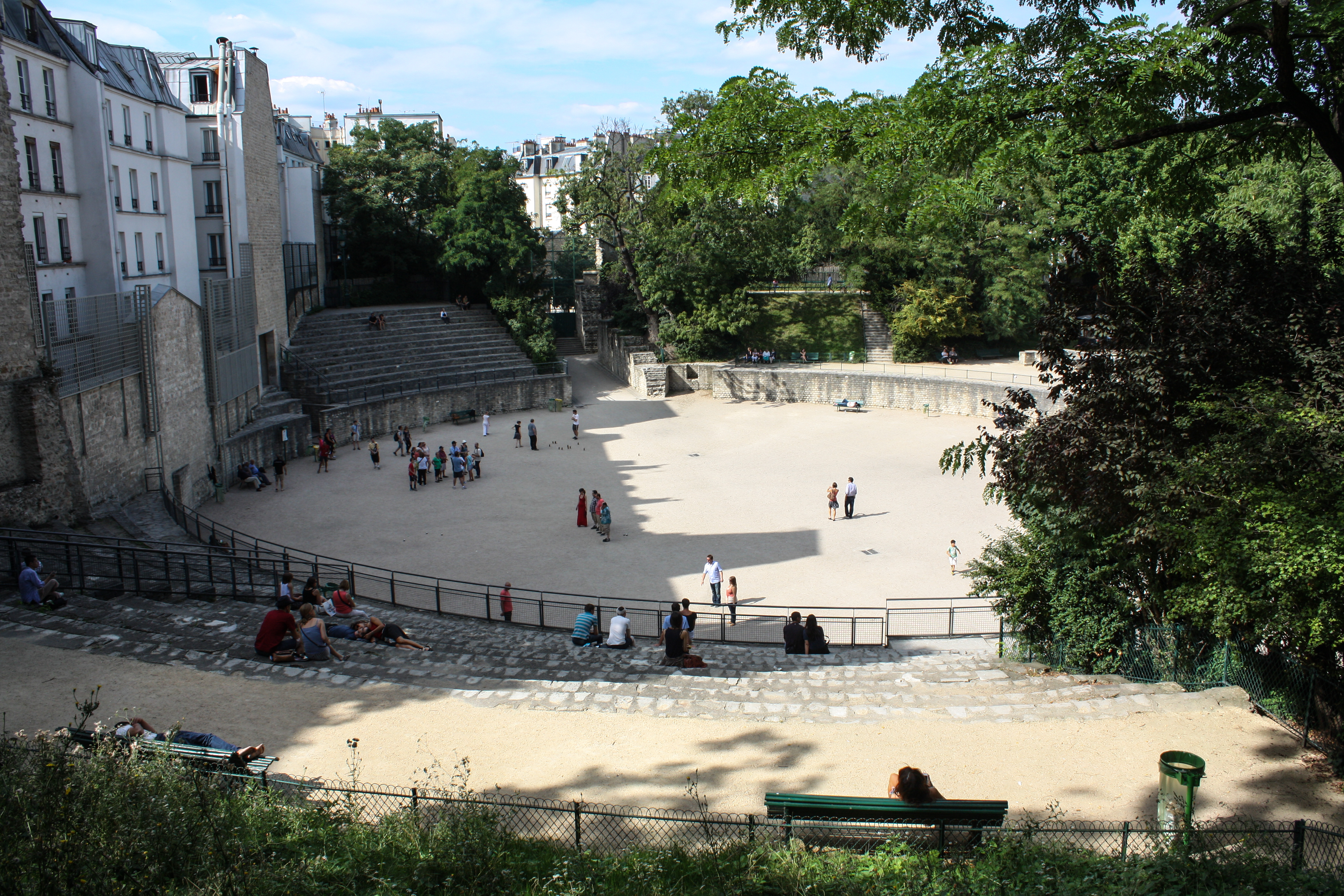
The Arènes de Lutèce, the open-air amphitheater of Lutece (1st century AD)

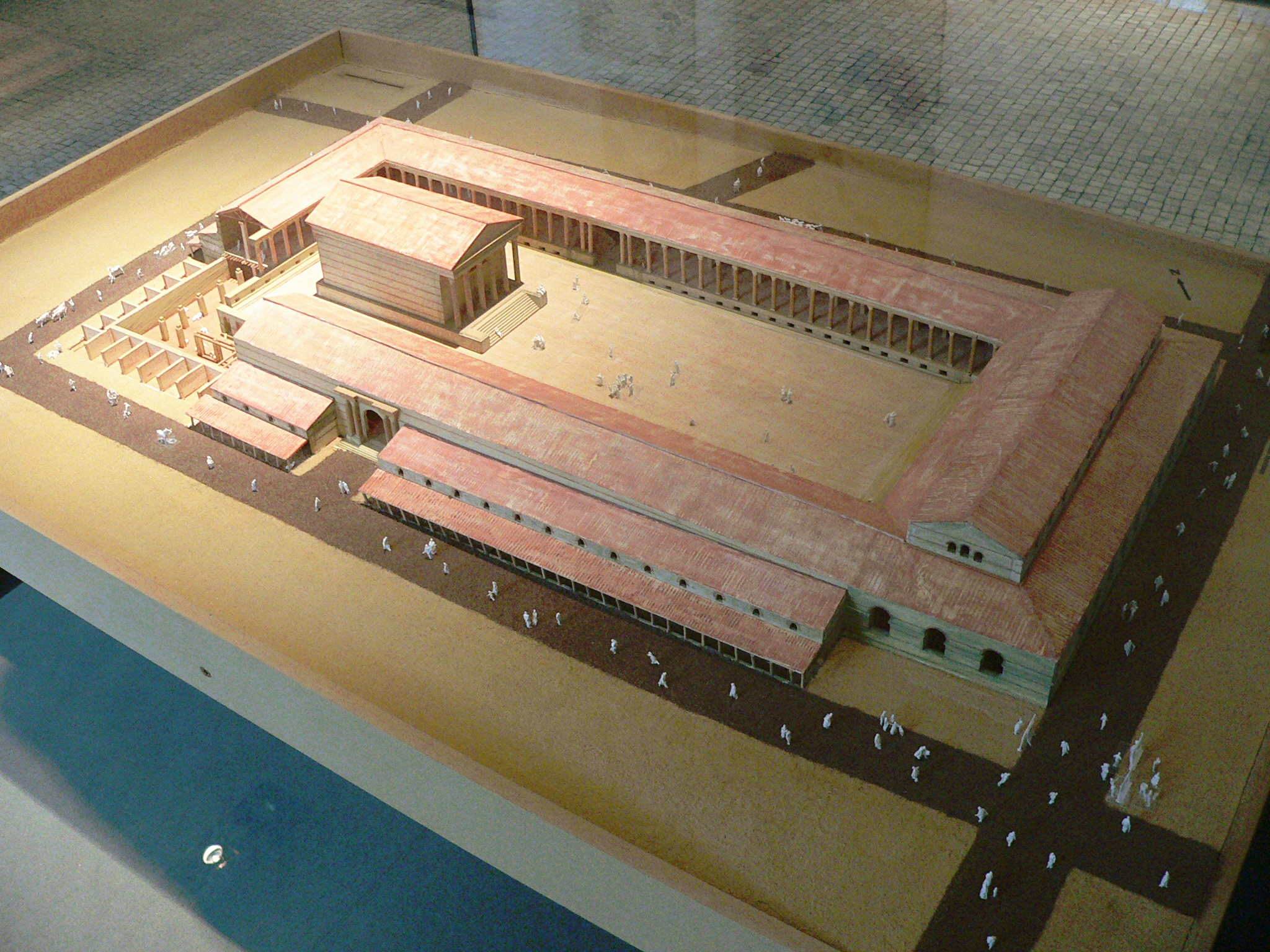
Model of the Roman forum of Lutetia (Musée Carnavalet)

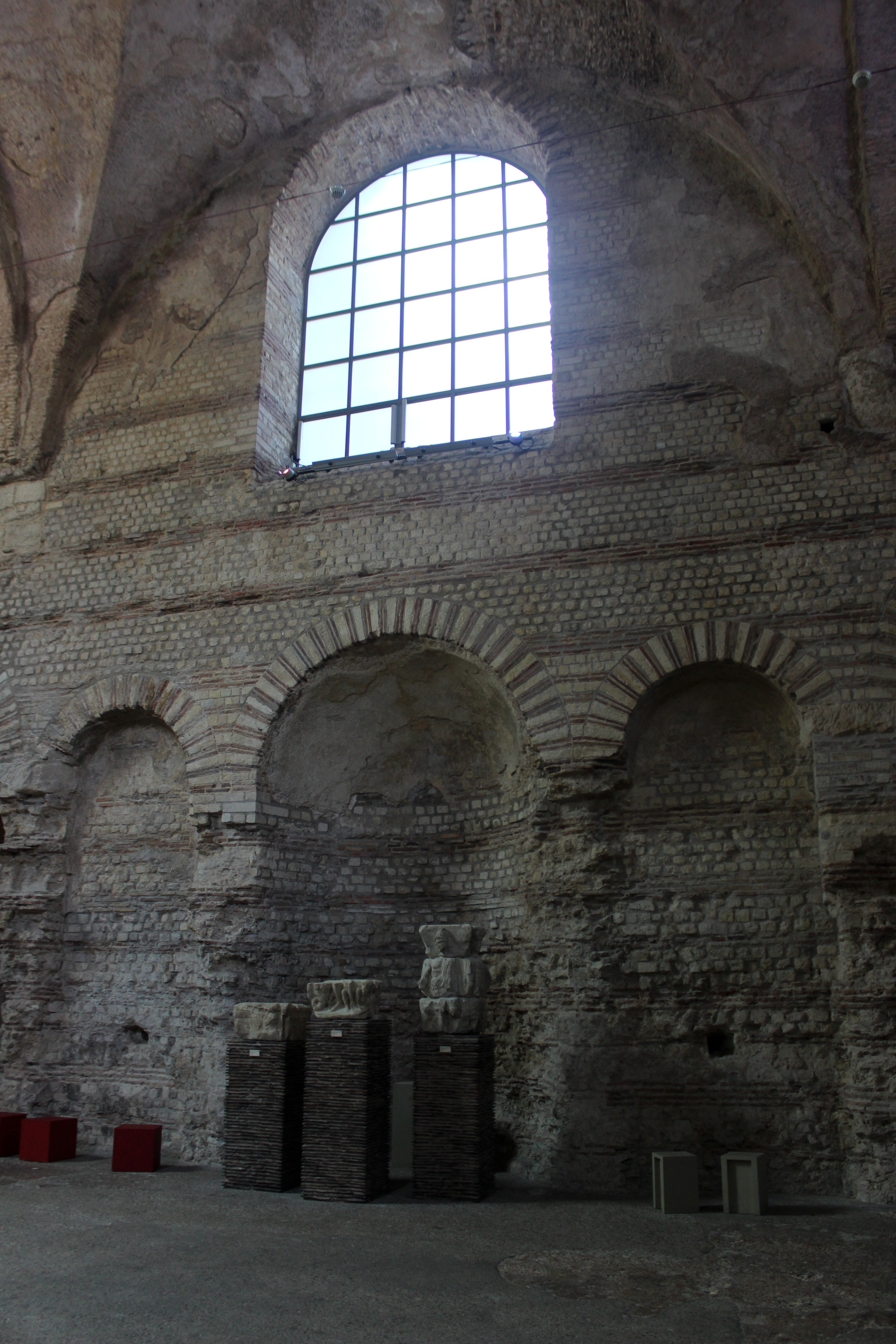
The Thermes de Cluny or Roman baths (2nd or 3rd century AD)

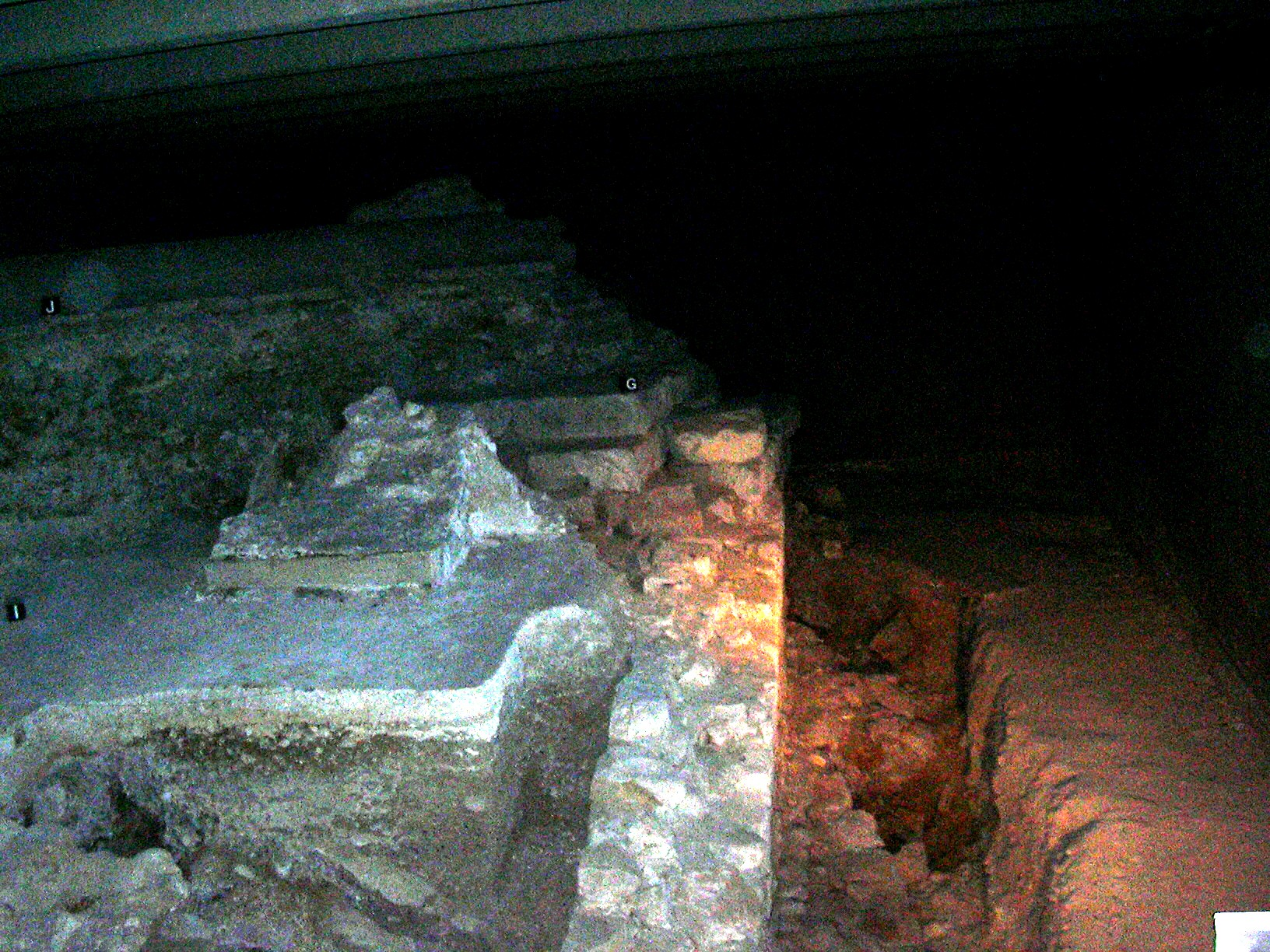
Remains of a Roman wall beneath the square in front of Notre-Dame de Paris

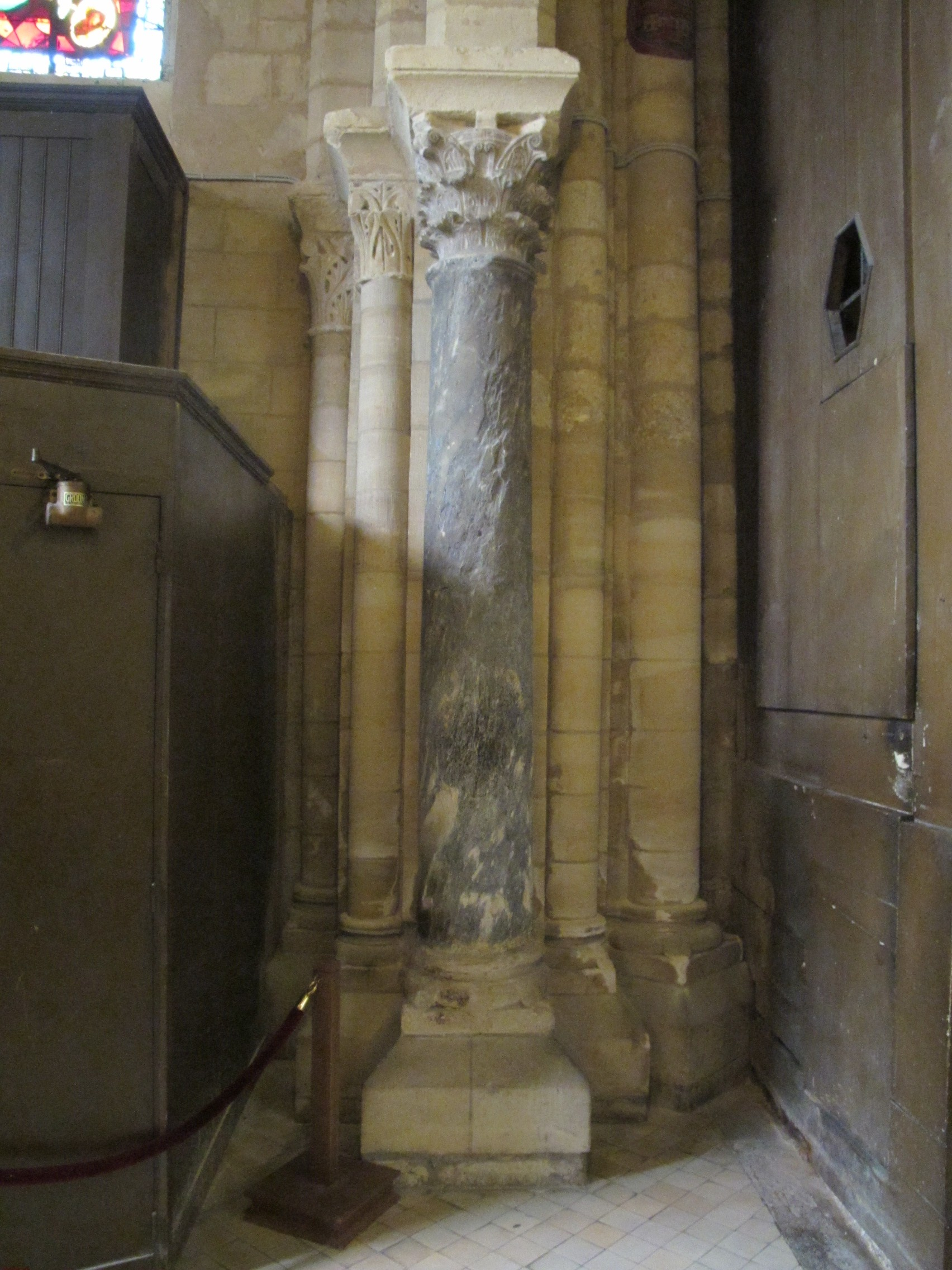
Ancient Roman column re-used in the nave of the Church of Saint-Pierre de Montmartre

Very little architecture remains from the ancient town of Lutetia, founded by a Celtic tribe known as the Parisii in about the 3rd century BC. It was conquered by the Romans in 52 BC, and turned into a Gallo-Roman garrison town. It was rebuilt in the 1st century AD on the classic Roman plan; a north–south axis, or cardo (now rue Saint-Jacques); and an east–west axis, or decumanus, of which traces have been found on the Île de la Cité, at rue de Lutèce. The center of Roman administration was on the island; the Roman governor's palace stood where the Palais de Justice is located today. The right bank was largely undeveloped. The city grew up the Left Bank, on the slopes of Mount Saint-Geneviève. The Roman forum was on the summit of the hill, under the present Rue Soufflot, between the boulevard Saint-Michel and rue Saint-Jacques.

The Roman town had three large baths near the forum, supplied with water by a 46-kilometer-long aqueduct. Vestiges of one bath, the Thermes de Cluny, can still be seen on Boulevard Saint-Michel. It was the largest of the three baths, one hundred meters by sixty-five meters, and was built at the end of the 2nd century or beginning of the 3rd century BC, at the height of the town's grandeur. The baths are now part of the Musée national du Moyen Âge, or National Museum of the Middle Ages. Nearby, on rue Monge, are the vestiges of the Roman amphitheater, called the Arènes de Lutèce, which was discovered and restored in the 19th century. Though the population of the town was probably no more than 5–6 thousand persons, the amphitheater measured 130 meters by 100 meters, and could seat fifteen thousand persons. Fifteen tiers of seats remain from the original thirty-five. It was built in the 1st century AD and was used for the combat of gladiators and animals, and also for theatrical performances.

Another notable piece of Gallo-Roman architecture was discovered under the choir of Notre-Dame de Paris; the Pillar of the Boatmen, a fragment of a Roman column with carvings of both Roman and Gallic gods. It was probably made at the beginning of the 1st century during the reign of the Emperor Tiberius to honor the league of the boatmen, who played an important part in the town's economy and religious and civic life. It is now on display in the Roman baths at the Museum of the Middle Ages. Other fragments of Gallo-Roman architecture are found in the crypt under the square in front of the Cathedral of Notre Dame; and in the Church of Saint-Pierre de Montmartre, where several Roman columns, probably from a temple, were re-used in the late 12th century to build a Christian church.

== Romanesque churches ==
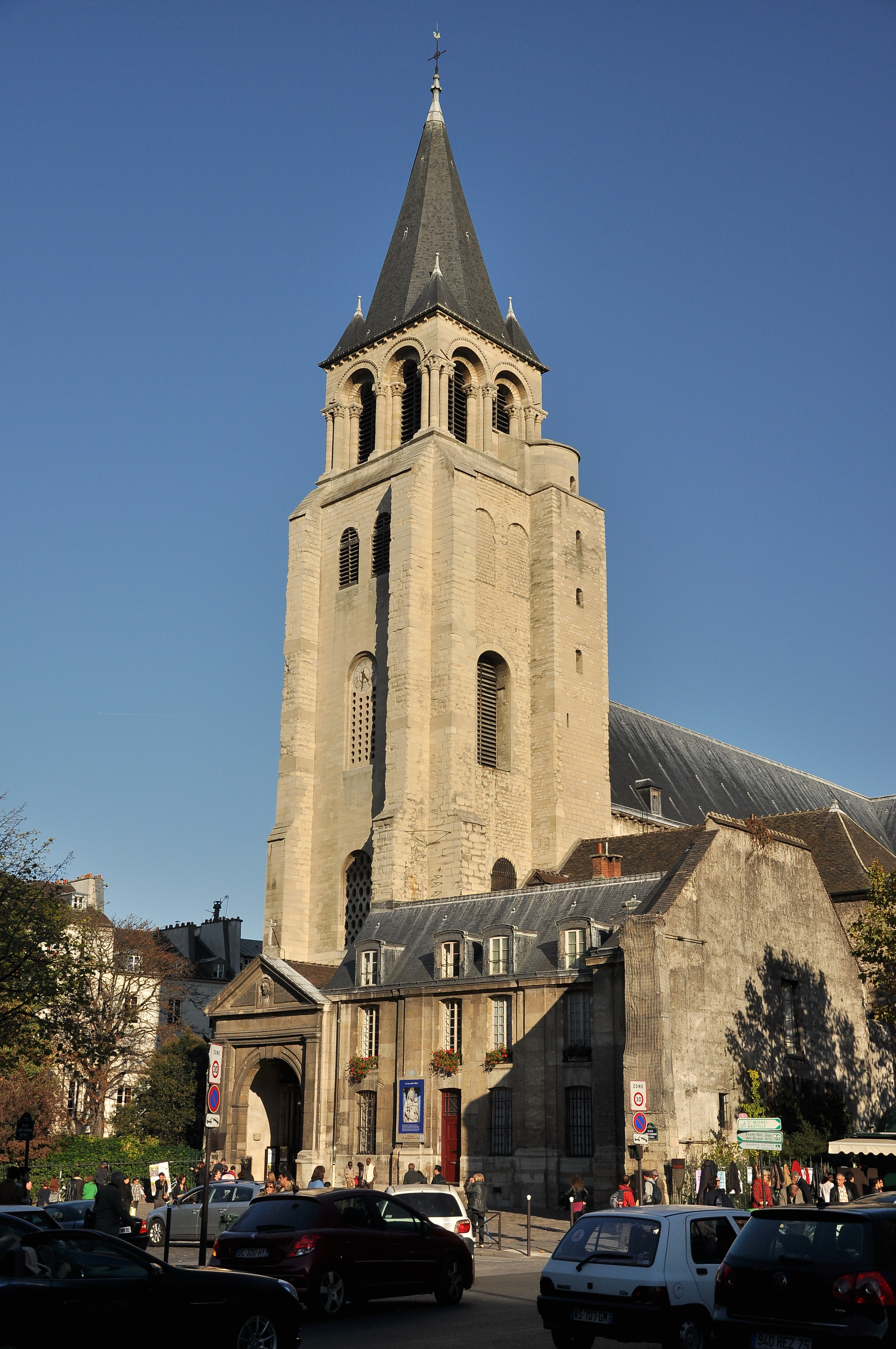
Romanesque bell tower of the Abbey of Saint-Germain-des-Prés (990–1160)

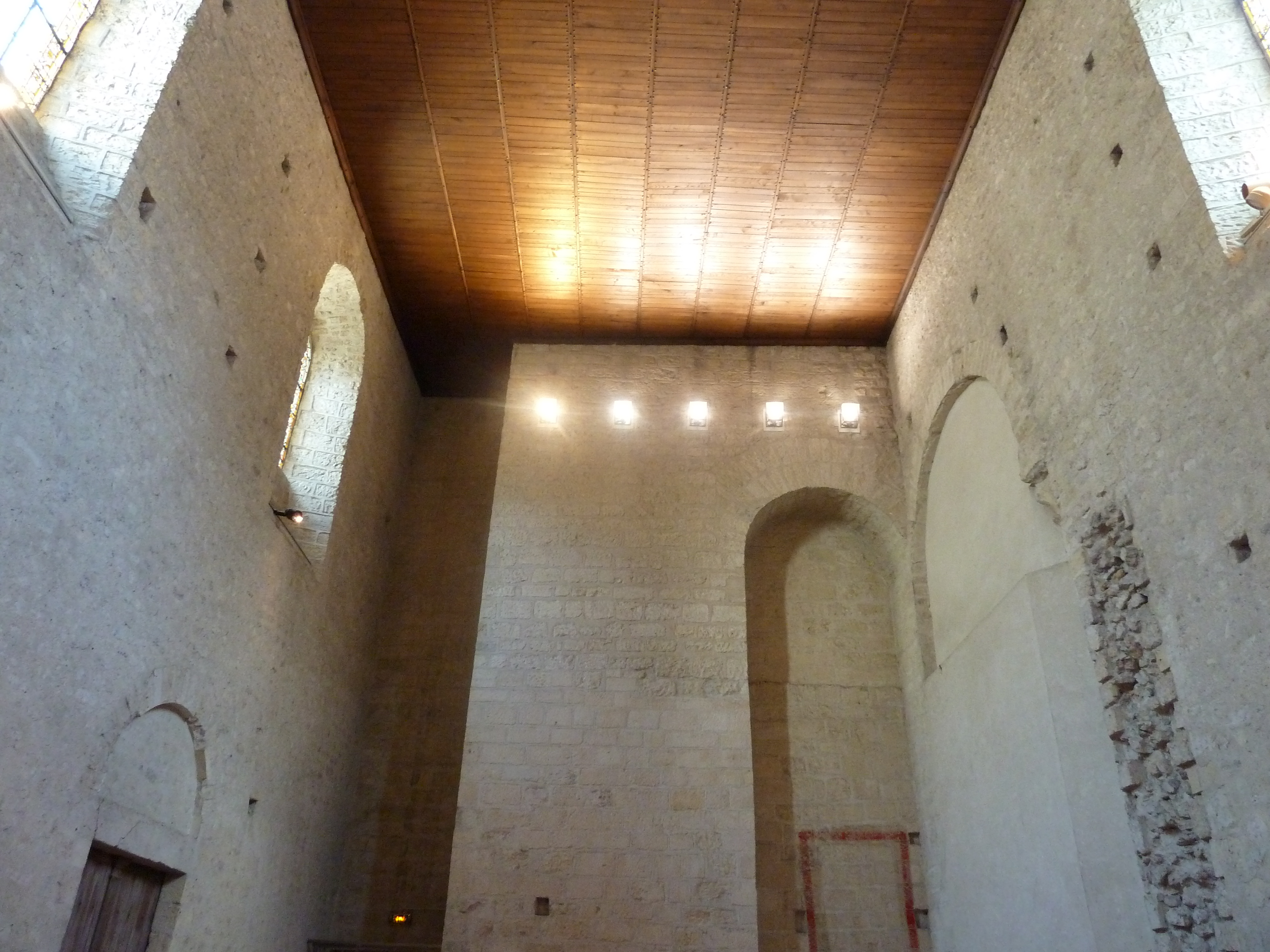
The Chapel of Saint Symphorien (11th century), the earliest chapel in the church of Saint-Germain-des-Prés

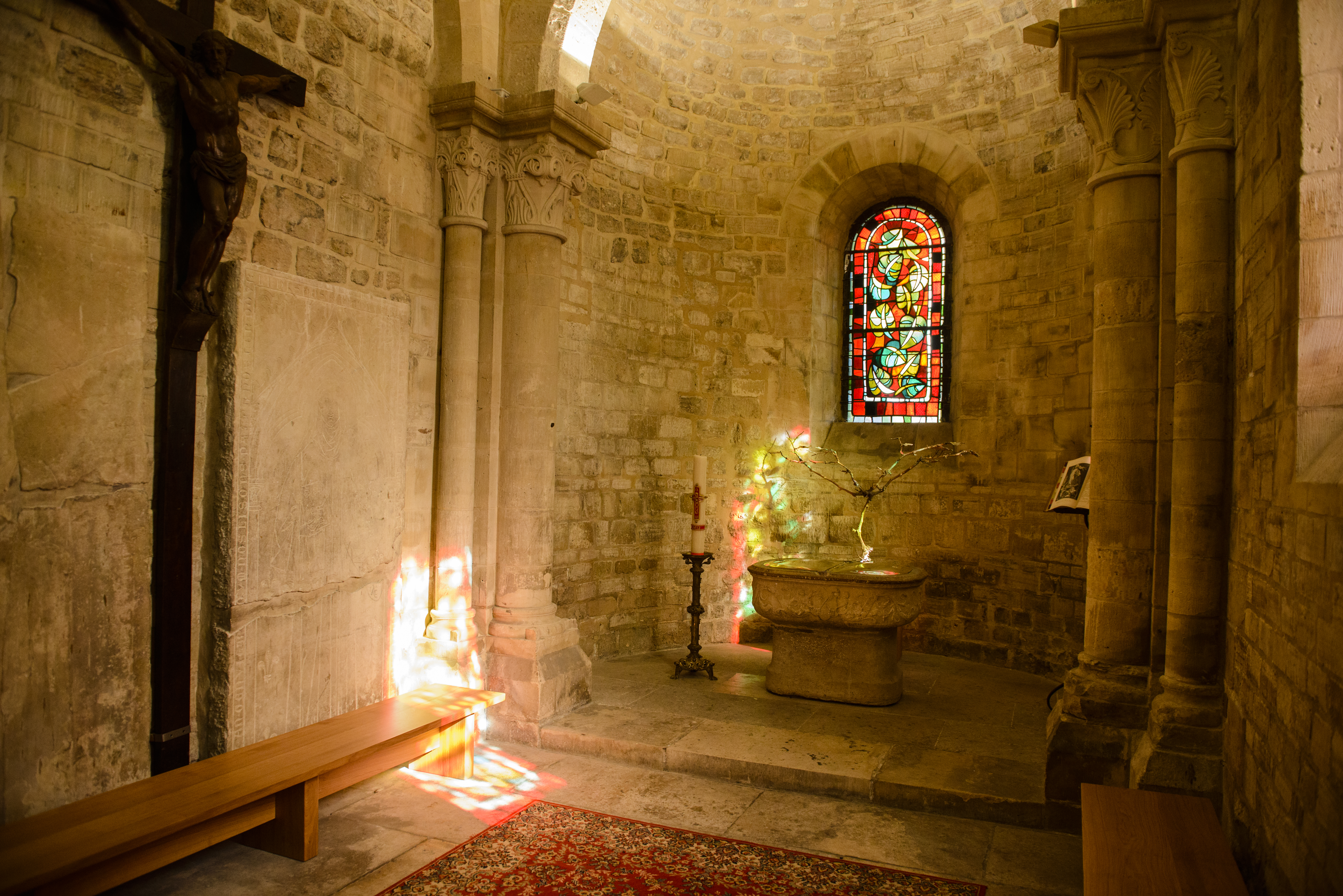
Interior of Saint-Pierre de Montmartre (1147–1200)

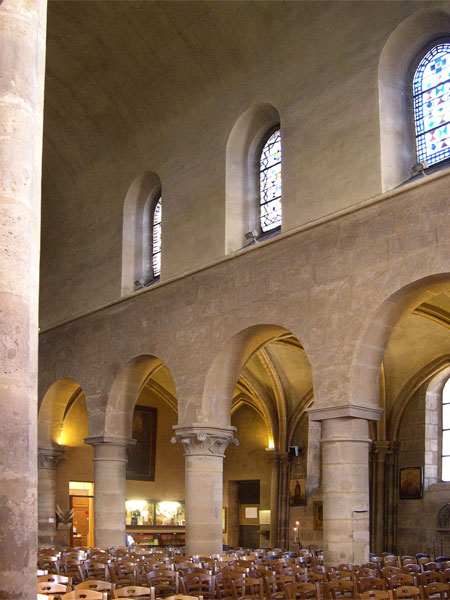
Interior of Saint-Julien-le-Pauvre (1170–1220)

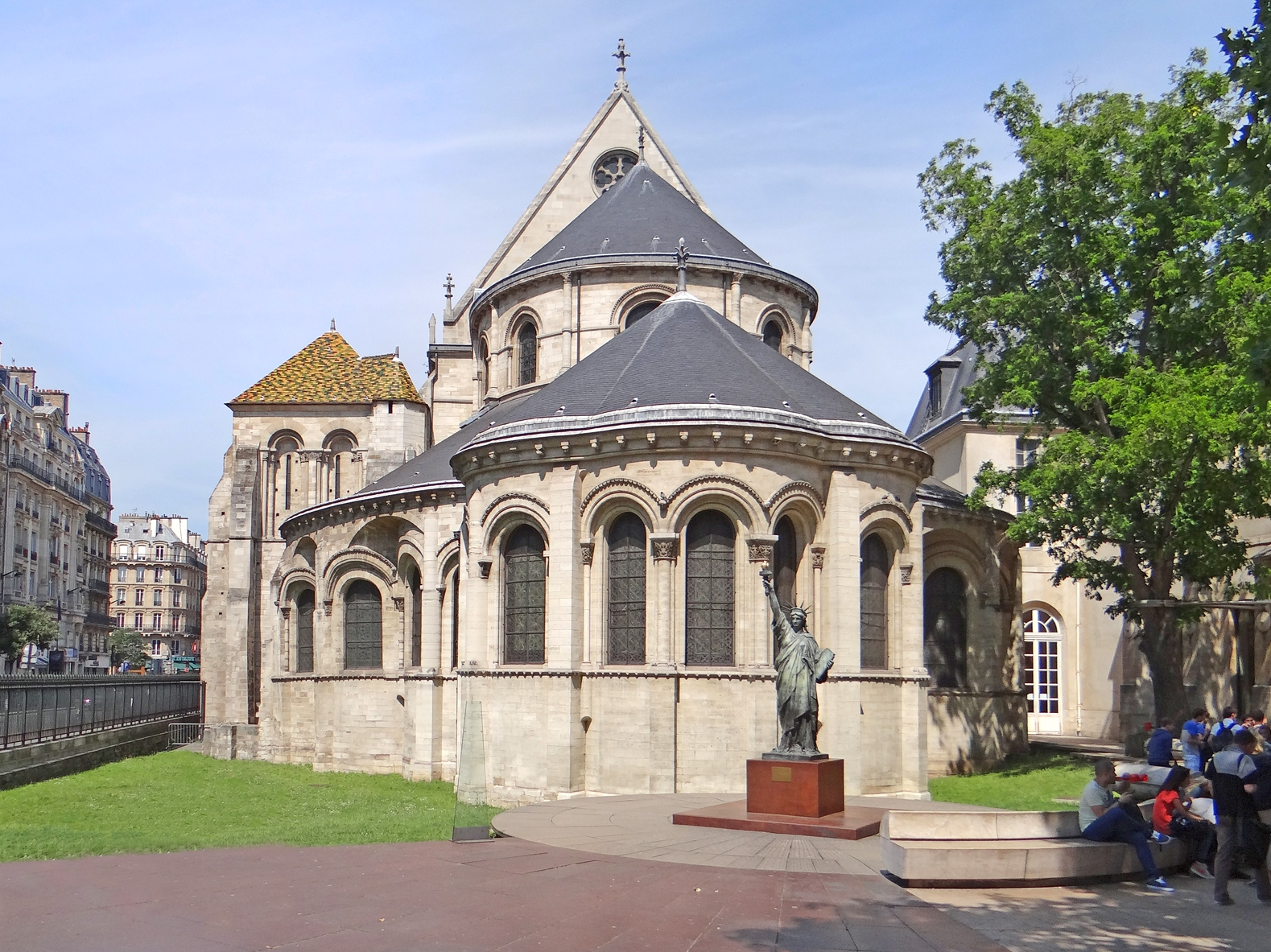
The former church of Saint-Martin-des-Champs (1060–1140) is now part of the Musée des arts et métiers

Unlike the Southern France, Paris has very few examples of Romanesque architecture; most churches and other buildings in that style were rebuilt in the Gothic style. The most remarkable example of Romanesque architecture in Paris is the church of the Abbey of Saint-Germain-des-Prés, built between 990 and 1160 during the reign of Robert the Pious. An earlier church had been destroyed by the Vikings in the 9th century. The oldest elements of the original church existing today are the tower (the belfry at the top was added in the 12th century), and the chapel of Saint Symphorien, on the south flank of the bell tower, built in the 11th century. It is considered the earliest existing place of worship in Paris. The gothic choir, with its flying buttresses, was added in the mid-12th century, it was consecrated by Pope Alexander III, in 1163. It was one of the earliest Gothic style elements to appear in a Paris church.

Romanesque and Gothic elements are found together in several old Paris churches. The church of Saint-Pierre de Montmartre (1147–1200) is the only surviving building of the vast Abbey of Montmartre, which once covered the top of the hill; it has both ancient Roman columns and one of the first examples of a Gothic arched ceiling, in the nave near the choir. The interior of the church of Saint-Julien-le-Pauvre (1170–1220) has been extensively rebuilt, but it still has massive Romanesque columns and the exterior is a classic example of the Romano-Gothic style. The former priory of Saint-Martin-des-Champs (1060–1140) has a choir and chapels supported by contreforts and a Romanesque bell tower. It now belongs to the Musee des Arts et Metiers.

== The Middle Ages ==
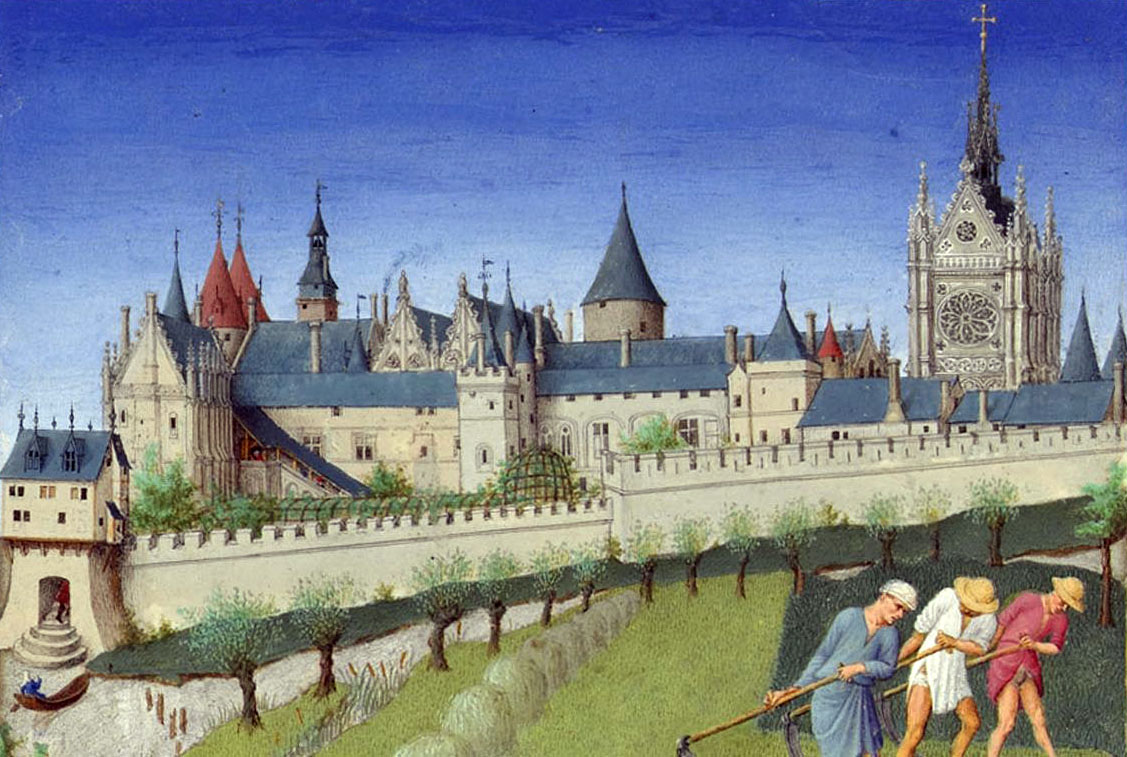
The Palais de la Cité as it appeared between 1412 and 1416, as illustrated in the Très Riches Heures du Duc de Berry

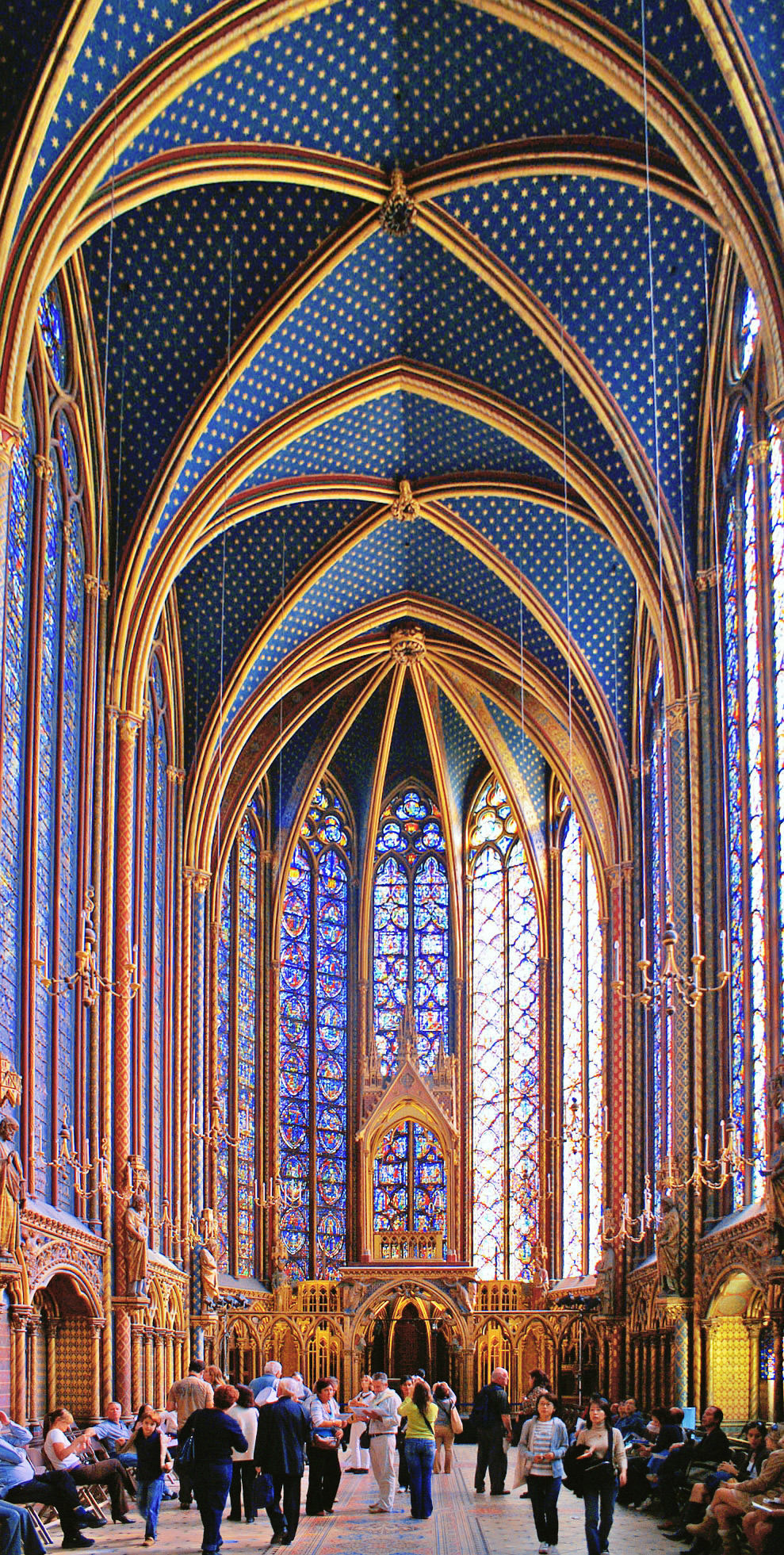
Upper chapel of Sainte-Chapelle (1242–48)

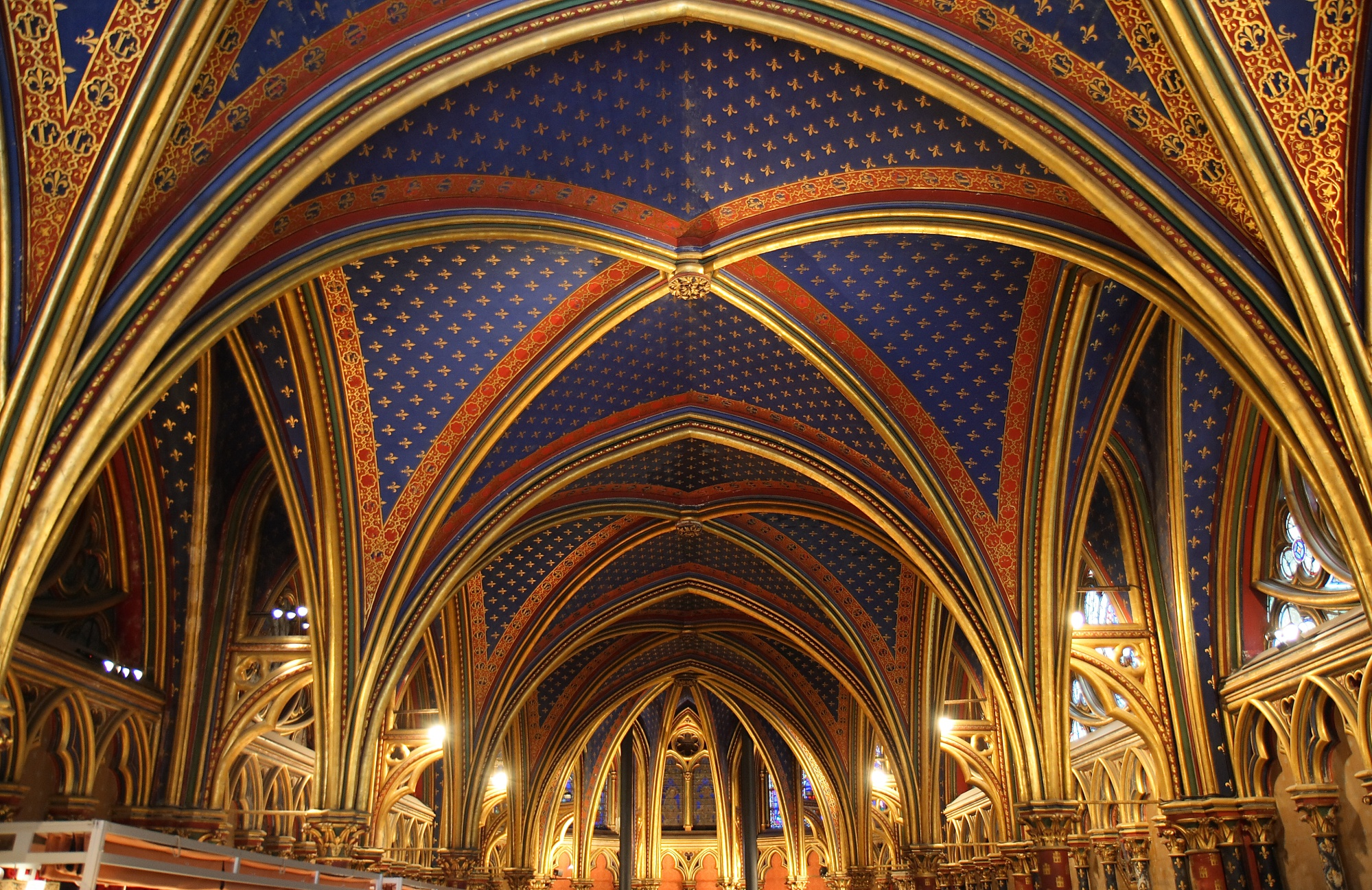
Ceiling of the lower chapel of Sainte-Chapelle (1242–48)

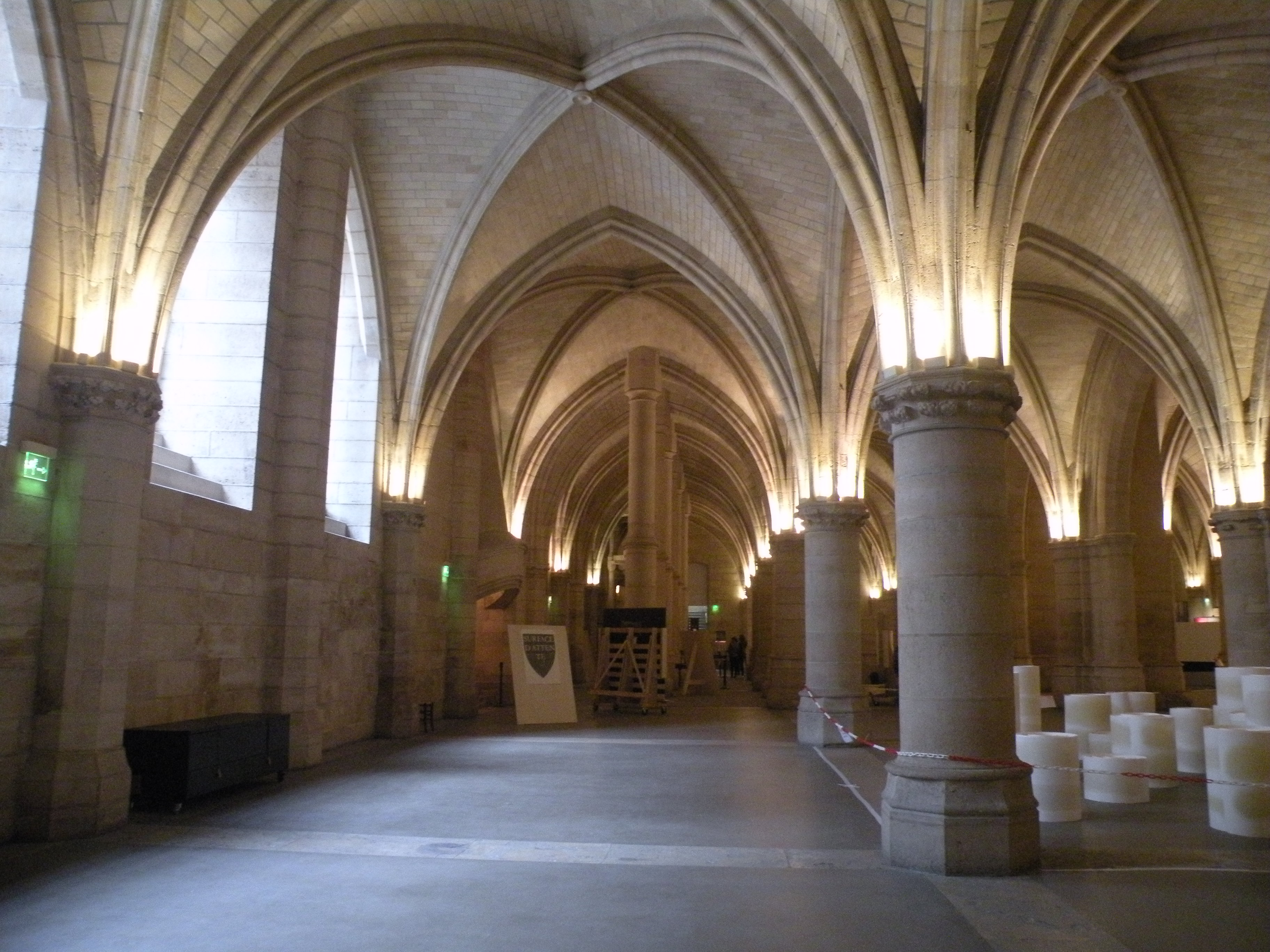
The Conciergerie; the Hall of the Men-at-Arms (early 14th century)

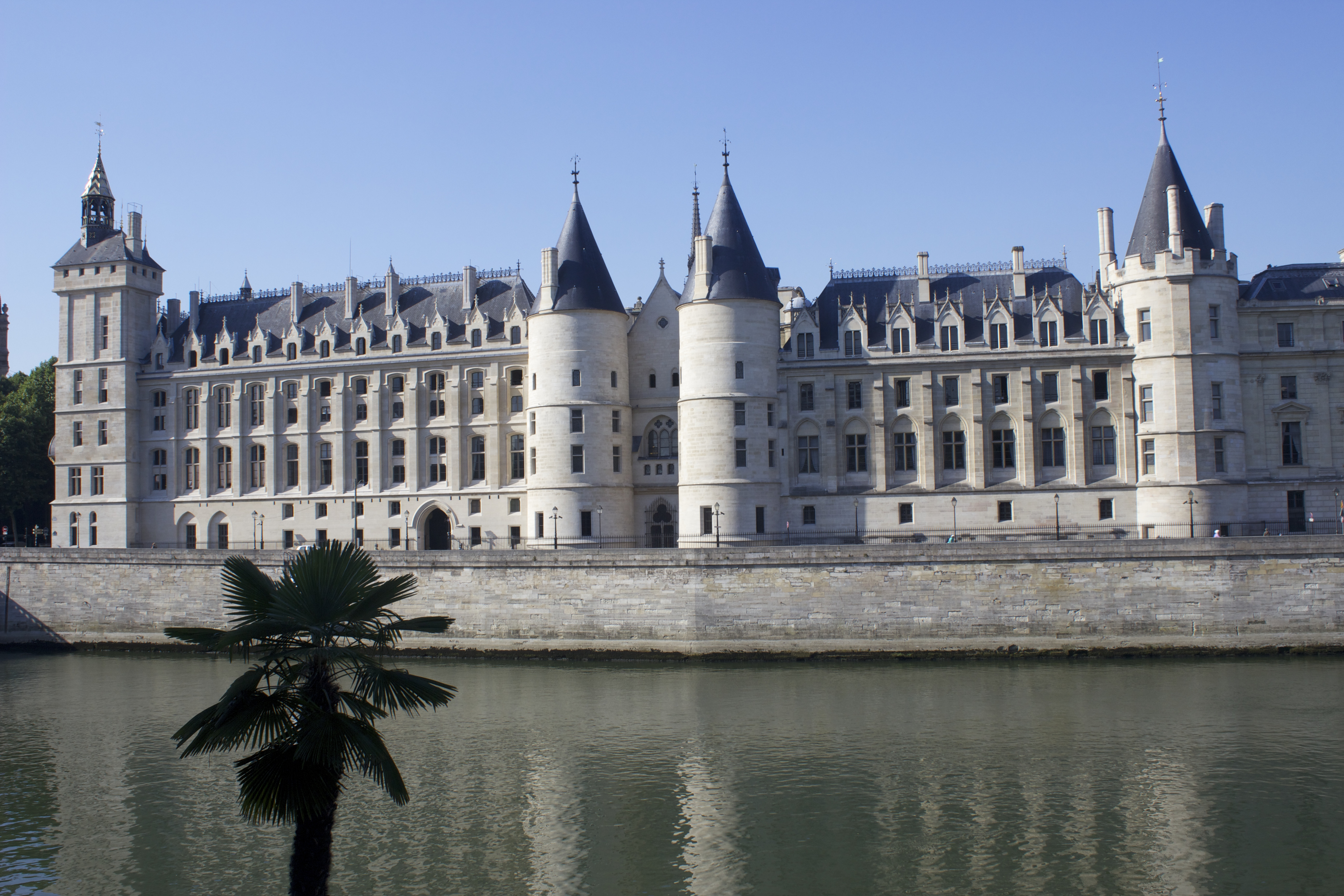
The original towers of the Palais de la Cité; the Tour Bonbec (1226–70), far right, is the oldest; the Cesar Tower and Silver Tower (center) and Horloge Tower (left) were built in the 14th century.

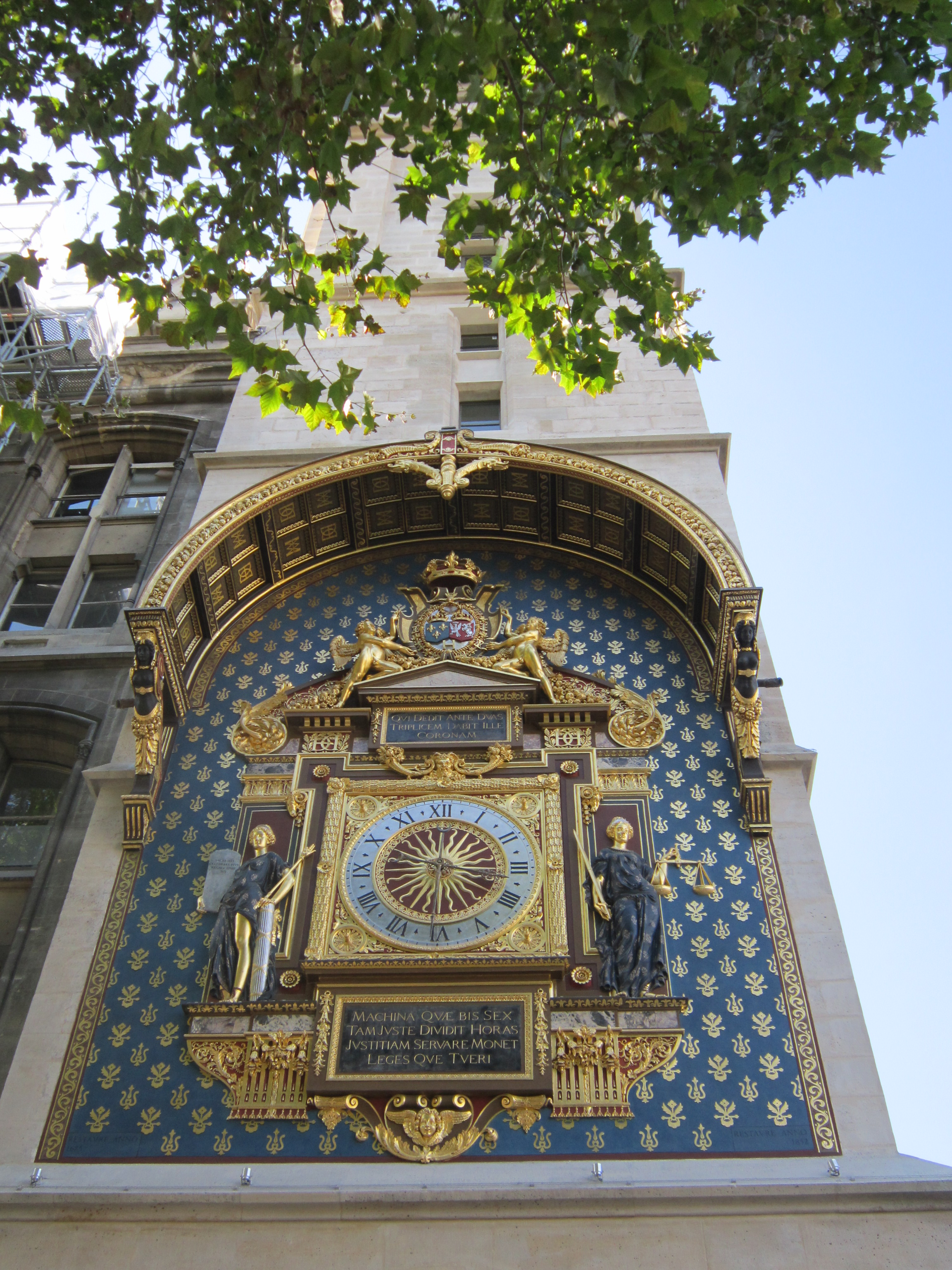
The first clock was installed on the tower of the Horloge in 1370. The current clock is modern.

=== The Palais de la Cité ===
In 987 Hugues Capet became the first King of France, and established his capital in Paris, though at the time his kingdom was little bigger than the Île-de-France, or modern Paris region. The first royal residence, the Palais de la Cité, was established within the fortress at the western end of the Île de la Cité, where the Roman governors had established their residence. Capet and his successors gradually enlarged their kingdom through marriages and conquests. His son, Robert the Pious (972–1031), built the first palace, the Palais de la Cité, and royal chapel within the walls of the fortress, and his successors embellished it over the centuries; by the reign of Philippe le Bel in the 14th century, it was the most magnificent palace in Europe. The tallest structure was the Grosse Tour, or great tower, built by Louis le Gros between 1080 and 1137. It had a diameter of 11.7 meters at the base and walls three meters thick, and remained until its demolition in 1776. The ensemble of buildings (seen in the image at right as they were between 1412 and 1416) included a royal residence, a great hall for ceremonies, and four large towers along the Seine on the north side of the island, as well as a gallery of luxury shops, the first Paris shopping center. Between 1242 and 1248 King Louis IX, later known as Saint Louis, built an exquisite Gothic chapel, Sainte-Chapelle, to house the relics of the Passion of Christ which he had acquired from the Emperor of Byzantium.

In 1358, a rebellion of the Parisian merchants against the royal authority, led by Étienne Marcel, caused the King, Charles V, to move his residence to a new palace, the Hôtel Saint-Pol, near the Bastille at the eastern edge of the city. The Palace was used occasionally for special ceremonies and to welcome foreign monarchs, but housed the administrative offices and courts of the Kingdom, as well as an important prison. The Great Hall was destroyed by a fire in 1618, rebuilt; another fire in 1776 destroyed the residence of the King, the tower of Montgomery. During the French Revolution, the revolutionary tribunal was housed in the building; hundreds of persons, including Queen Marie Antoinette, were tried and imprisoned there, before being taken to the guillotine. After the Revolution the Conciergerie served as a prison and courthouse. It was burned by the Paris Commune in 1871, but was rebuilt. The prison was closed in 1934, and the Conciergerie became a museum.

Several vestiges of the medieval Palais de la Cité, extensively modified and restored, can still be seen today; the royal chapel, Sainte-Chapelle; the Hall of the Men-at-Arms, (early 14th century), the former dining hall of the palace officials and guards, located underneath the now-vanished Great Hall; and the four towers along the Seine facing the right bank. The façade was built in the 19th century. The tower on the far right, the Tour Bonbec, is the oldest, built between 1226 and 1270 during the reign of Louis IX, or Saint Louis. It is distinguished by the crenelation at the top of the tower. It originally was a story shorter than the other towers, but was raised to match their height in the renovation of the 19th century. The tower served as the primary torture chamber during the Middle Ages. The two towers in the center, the Tour de César and the Tour d'Argent, were built in the 14th century, during the reign of Philippe le Bel. The tallest tower, the Tour de l'Horloge, was constructed by Jean le Bon in 1350, and modified several times over the centuries. The first public clock in Paris, was added by Charles V in 1370. The sculptural decoration around the clock, featuring allegorical figures of The Law and Justice, was added in 1585 century by Henry III.

=== City walls and castles ===
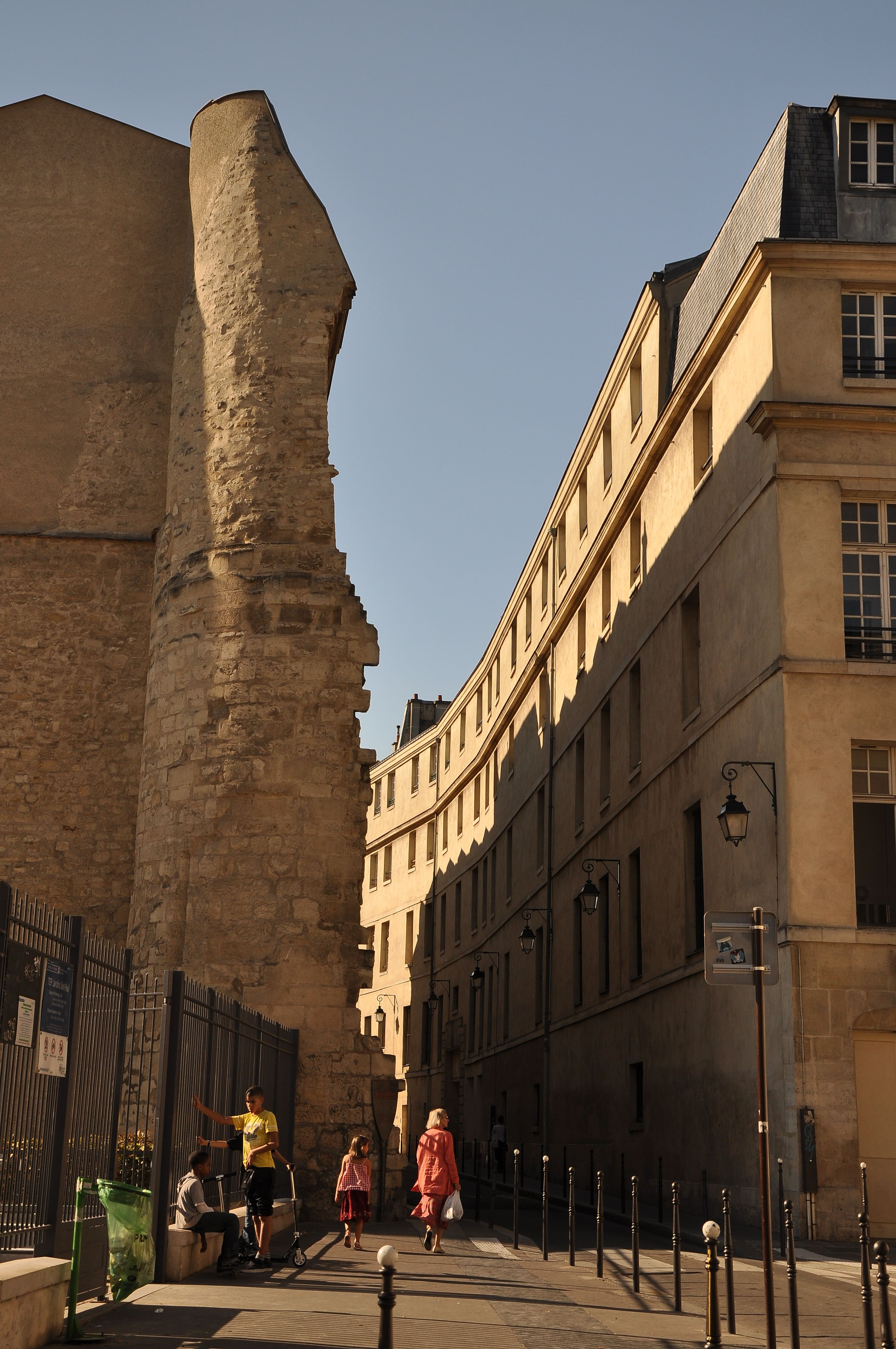
A vestige of the wall of Philippe Auguste, in the Le Marais quarter (1190–1202)

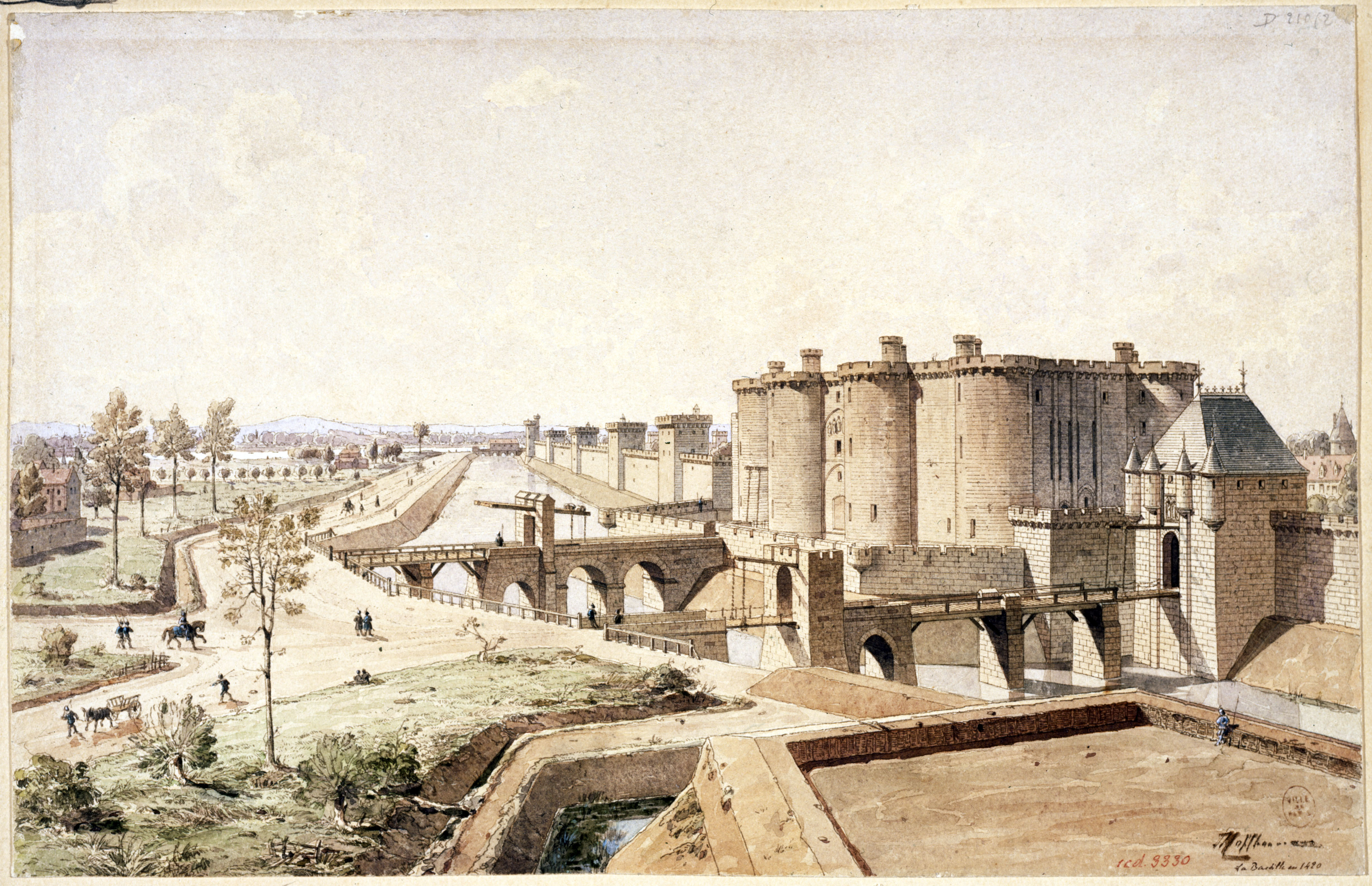
The Bastille. Reconstruction from between 1855 and 1905 of its appearance in 1420

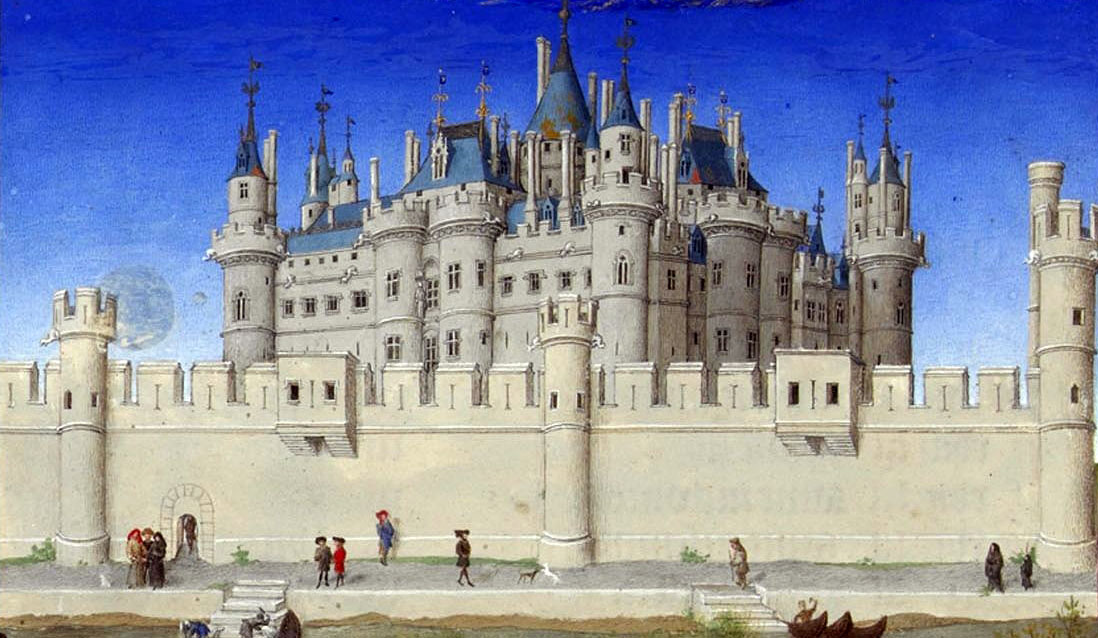
The Louvre in the 15th century, from the Très Riches Heures du Duc de Berry

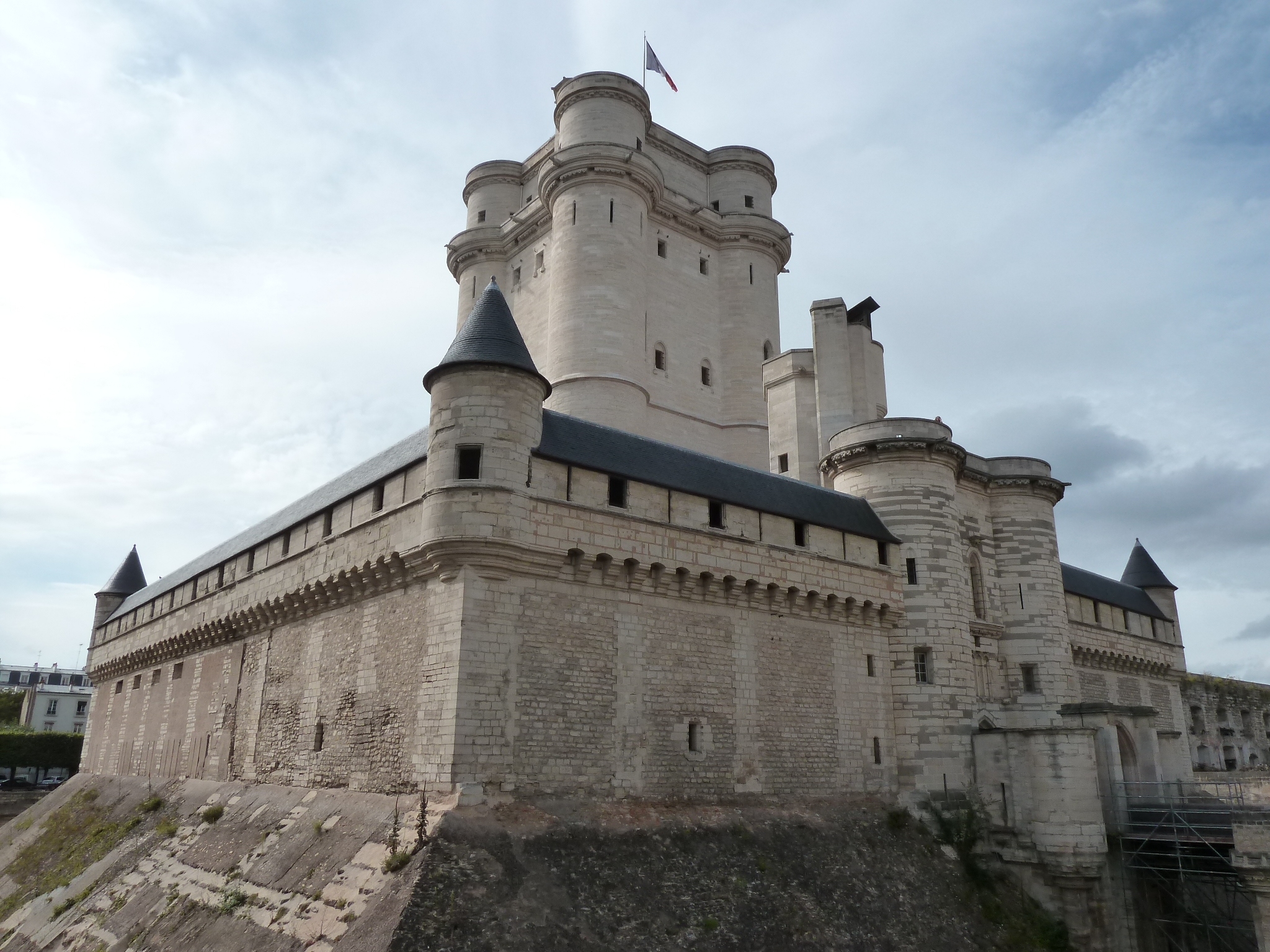
The Château de Vincennes (completed 1369)

Much of the architecture of medieval Paris was designed to protect the city and King against attack; walls, towers, and castles. Between 1190 and 1202, King Philippe-Auguste began construction of a wall five kilometers long to protect the city on the right bank. The wall was reinforced by seventy-seven circular towers, each no more than six meters in diameter. He also began construction of a large castle, the Louvre, where the wall met the river. The Louvre was protected by a moat and a wall with ten towers. In the center was a massive circular donjon or tower, thirty meters high and fifteen meters in diameter. It was not then the residence of the King, but Philippe Auguste placed the royal archives there. Another walled complex of buildings, the Temple, the headquarters of the Knights Templar, was located on the right bank, centered around a massive tower.

The city on the right bank continued to grow outwards. The Provost of the Merchants, Étienne Marcel, began building a new city wall in 1356, which doubled the area of the city. The Louvre, now surrounded by the city, was given rich decoration and a grand new stairway, and gradually became more of residence than a fortress. Charles V, in 1364–80, moved his primary residence from the City Palace to the Hôtel Saint-Pol, a comfortable new palace in the new Le Marais quarter. To protect his new palace and the eastern flank of the city, in 1370 Charles began building the Bastille, a fortress with six cylindrical towers. At the same time, further east, in the forest of Vincennes, Charles V built an even larger castle, the Château de Vincennes, dominated by another massive keep or tower fifty-two meters high. It was completed in 1369. Beginning in 1379, close to the Château, he began constructing a replica of Sainte-Chapelle. Unlike the Sainte-Chapelle in the city, the interior of the Sainte-Chapelle of Vincennes was not divided into two levels; the interior was a single space, flooded with light.

=== Churches – the birth of the Gothic Style ===
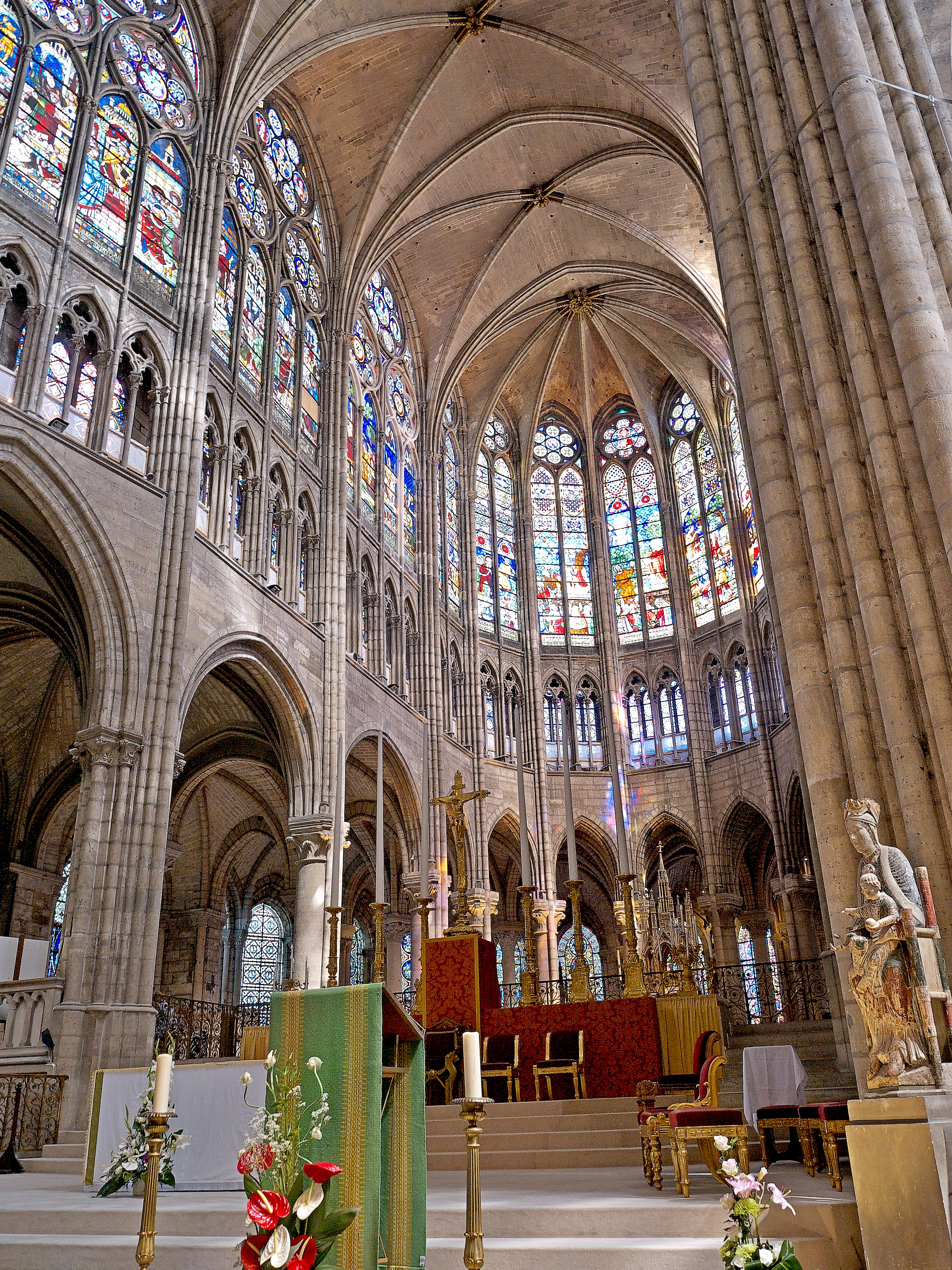
The choir of the Basilica of Saint-Denis (completed 1144), the birthplace of the Gothic style

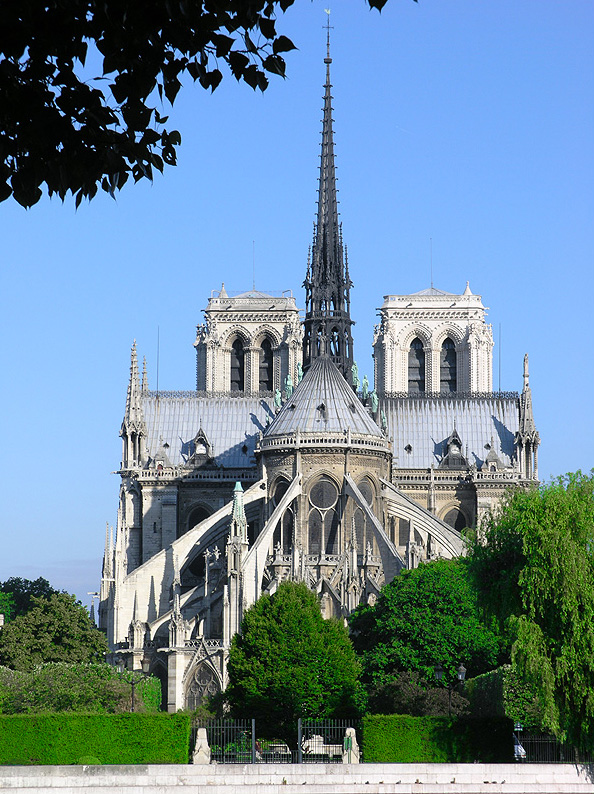
The later eastern portion of Notre-Dame de Paris, with its spire and flying buttresses (1160–1330)

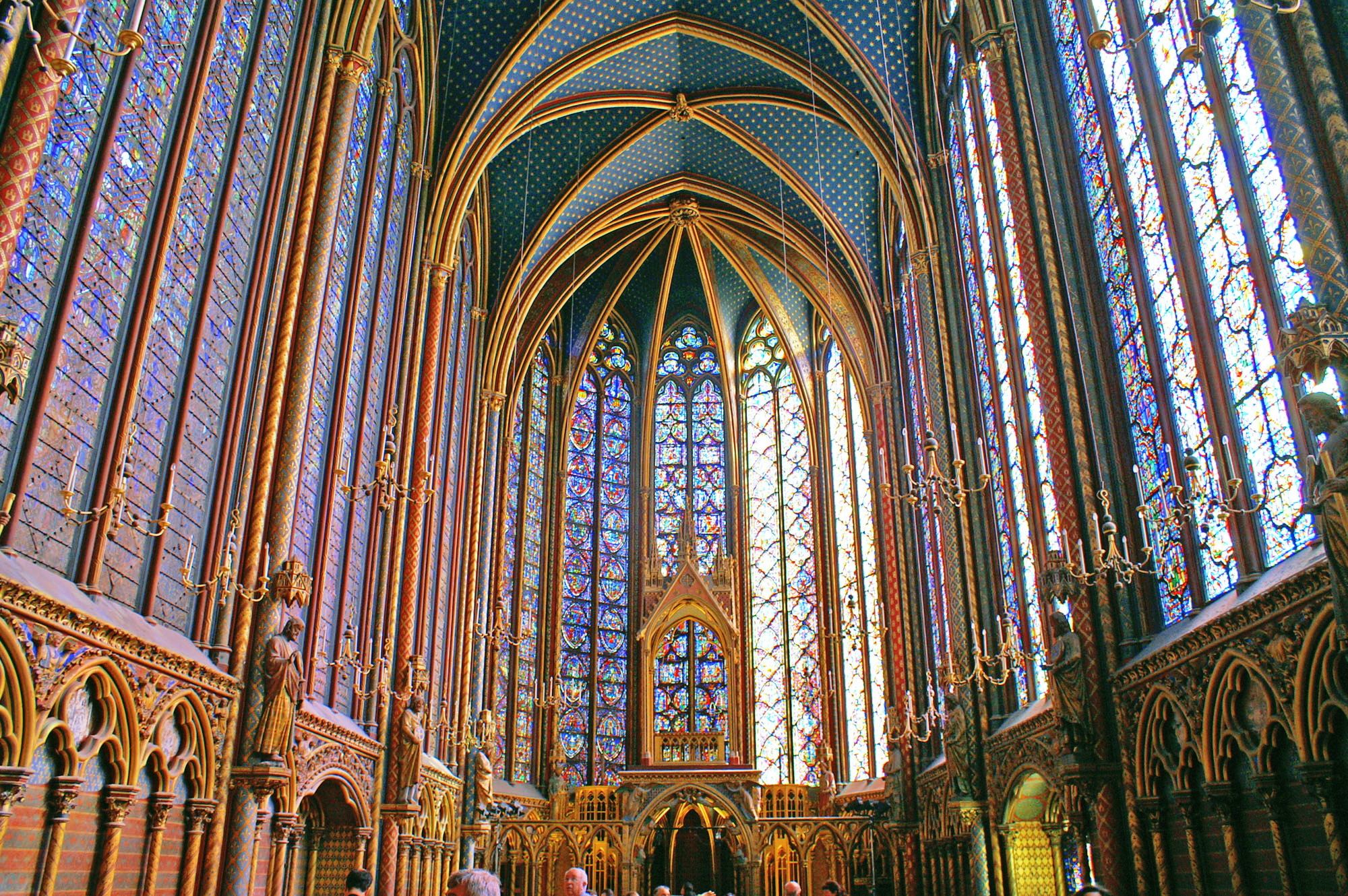
The upper level of Sainte-Chapelle, the summit of Rayonnant Gothic (1250)

The twisted pillar in the Church of Saint-Séverin (1489–95)

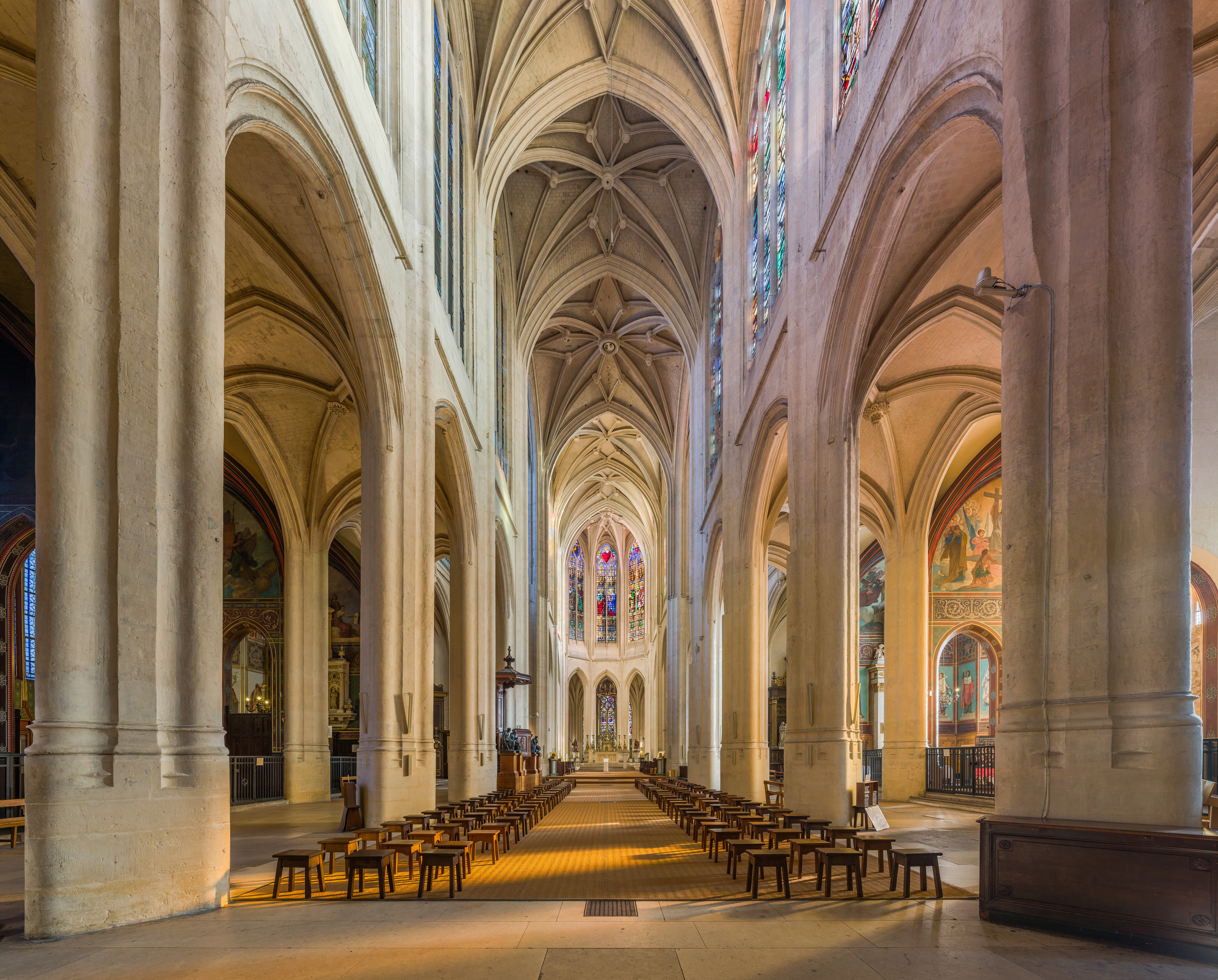
The church of St-Gervais-et-St-Protais (about 1490)

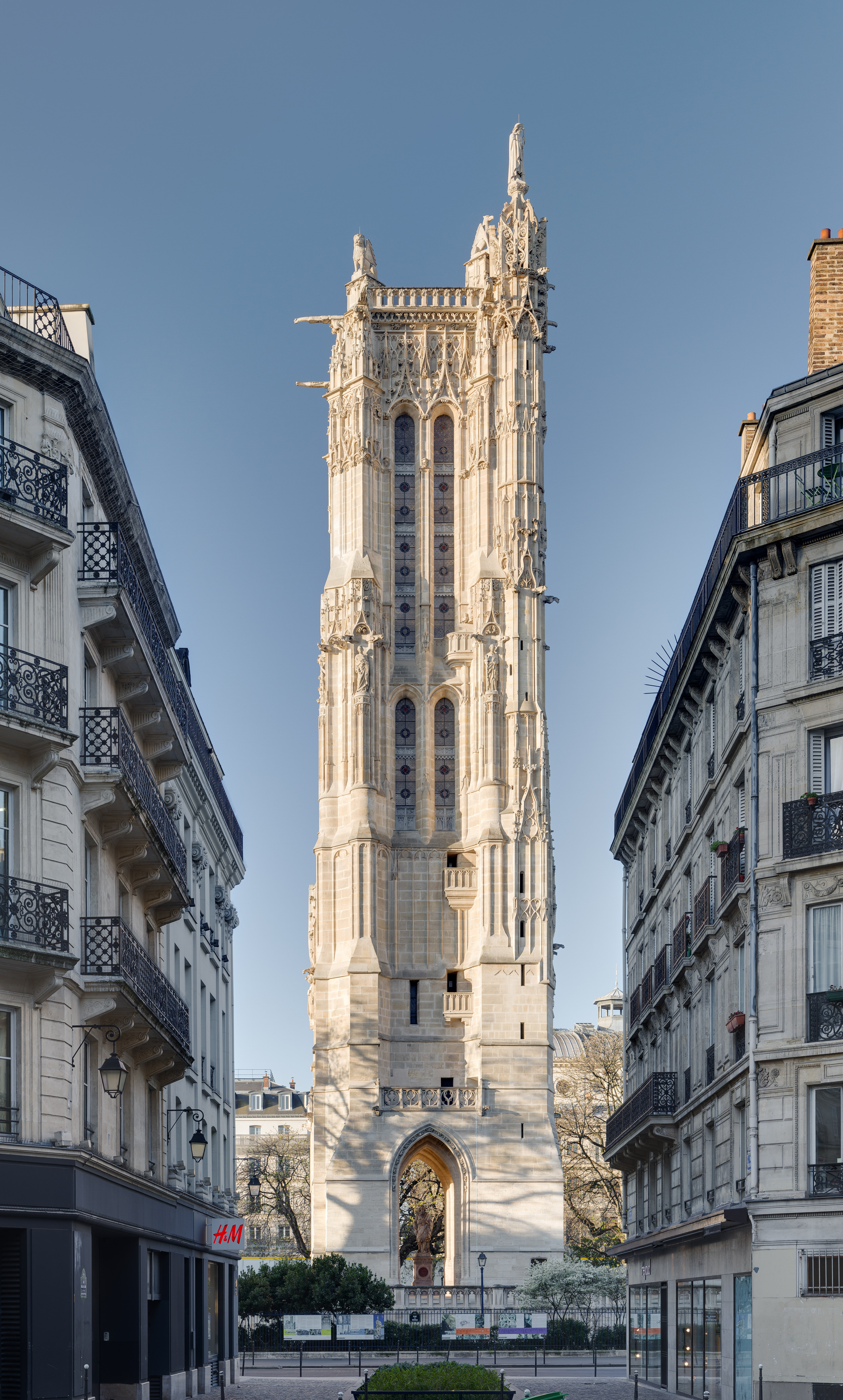
The Tour Saint-Jacques a surviving example of Flamboyant Gothic (1509–22)

The style of Gothic architecture was born in the rebuilding of the chevet of the Basilica of Saint-Denis, just outside Paris, finished in 1144. Twenty years later, the style was used on a much larger scale by Maurice de Sully in the construction of the Cathedral of Notre-Dame de Paris. The construction continued until the 14th century, beginning with the twin towers on the west toward the choir in the east. The style evolved as the construction continued; the opening of the rose window on the western façade were relatively narrow; the great rose windows of the central transept were much more delicate, and allowed in much more light. At the western end, the walls were supported by buttresses built directly against the walls; in the center, completed later, the walls were supported by two steps of flying buttresses. In the last century of construction, the buttresses were able to cross the same distance with a single stone arch. The towers on the west were more stately and solemn, in the classic Gothic style, while the eastern elements of the cathedral, with its combination of rose windows, spires, buttresses and pinnacles, belonged to more elaborate and decorative style, called the Gothic rayonnant.

Other Paris churches soon adapted the Gothic style; the choir of Abbey church of Saint-Germain-des-Prés was completely rebuilt in the new style, with pointed arches and flying buttresses. The church of Saint-Pierre de Montmartre was rebuilt with ogives, or Gothic pointed arches. The church of Saint-Germain l'Auxerois, next to the Louvre, was given a portal inspired by Notre Dame, and the Church of Saint-Séverin was given a Gothic nave with the first triforium, or first-story side gallery, in Paris. The supreme example of the new style was the upper chapel of Sainte-Chapelle, where the walls seemed to be made entirely of stained glass.

The Gothic Style went through another phase between 1400 and about 1550; the Flamboyant Gothic, which combined extremely refined forms and rich decoration. The style was used not only in churches, but also in some noble residences. Notable existing examples are the Church of Saint-Séverin (1489–95) with its famous twisting pillar; the elegant choir of the church of St-Gervais-et-St-Protais; the Tour Saint-Jacques, the flamboyant Gothic vestige of an abbey church destroyed during the Revolution; and the chapel of the residence of the Abbots of Cluny, now the Museum of the Middle Ages, and the ceiling of the Tour Saint-Jean-Sans-Peur, a vestige of the former residence of the Dukes of Burgundy, in the 2nd arrondissement.

=== Houses and manors ===
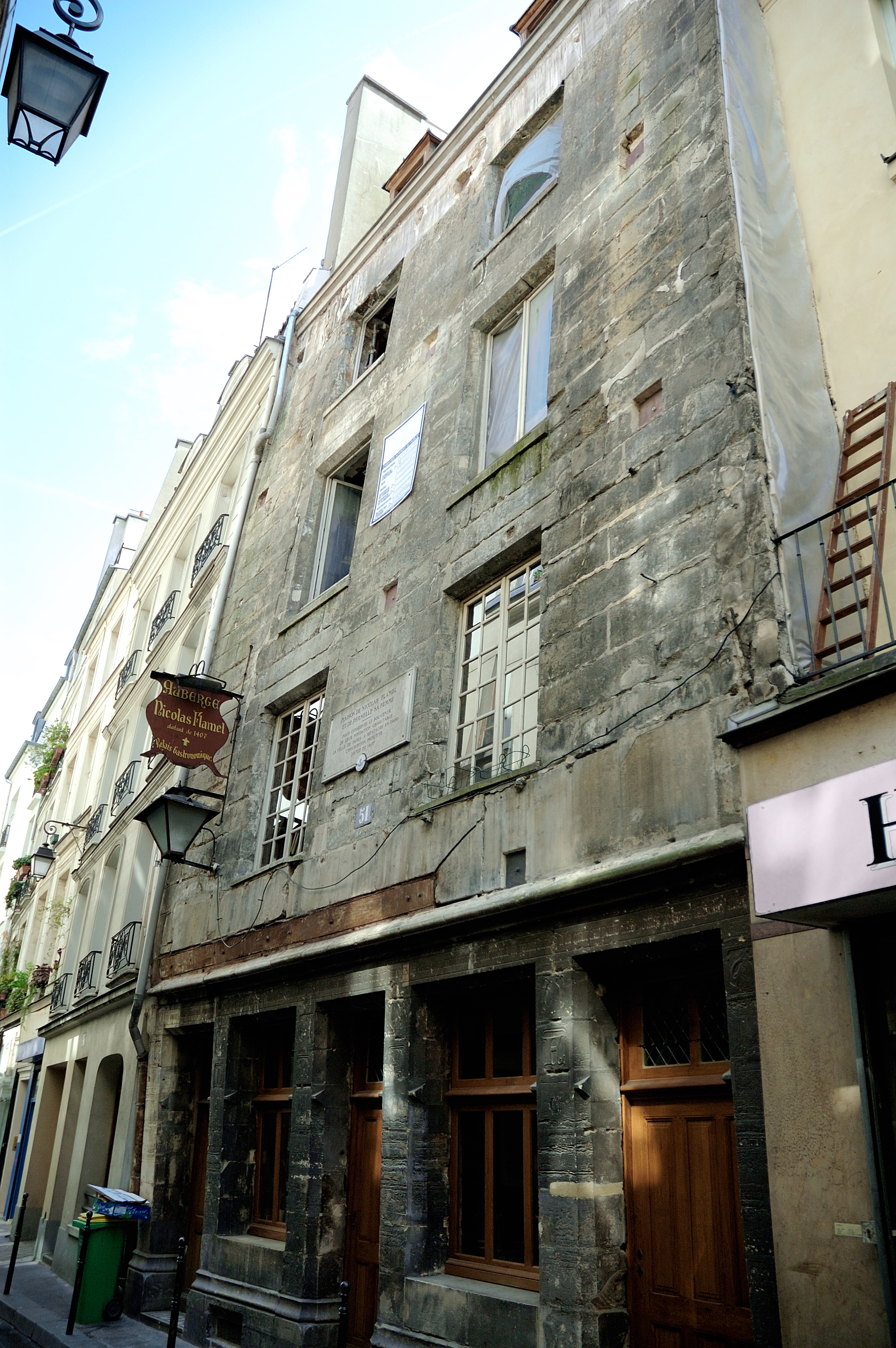
The house of Nicolas Flamel (1407), considered the oldest house in Paris, was actually a kind of hostel.

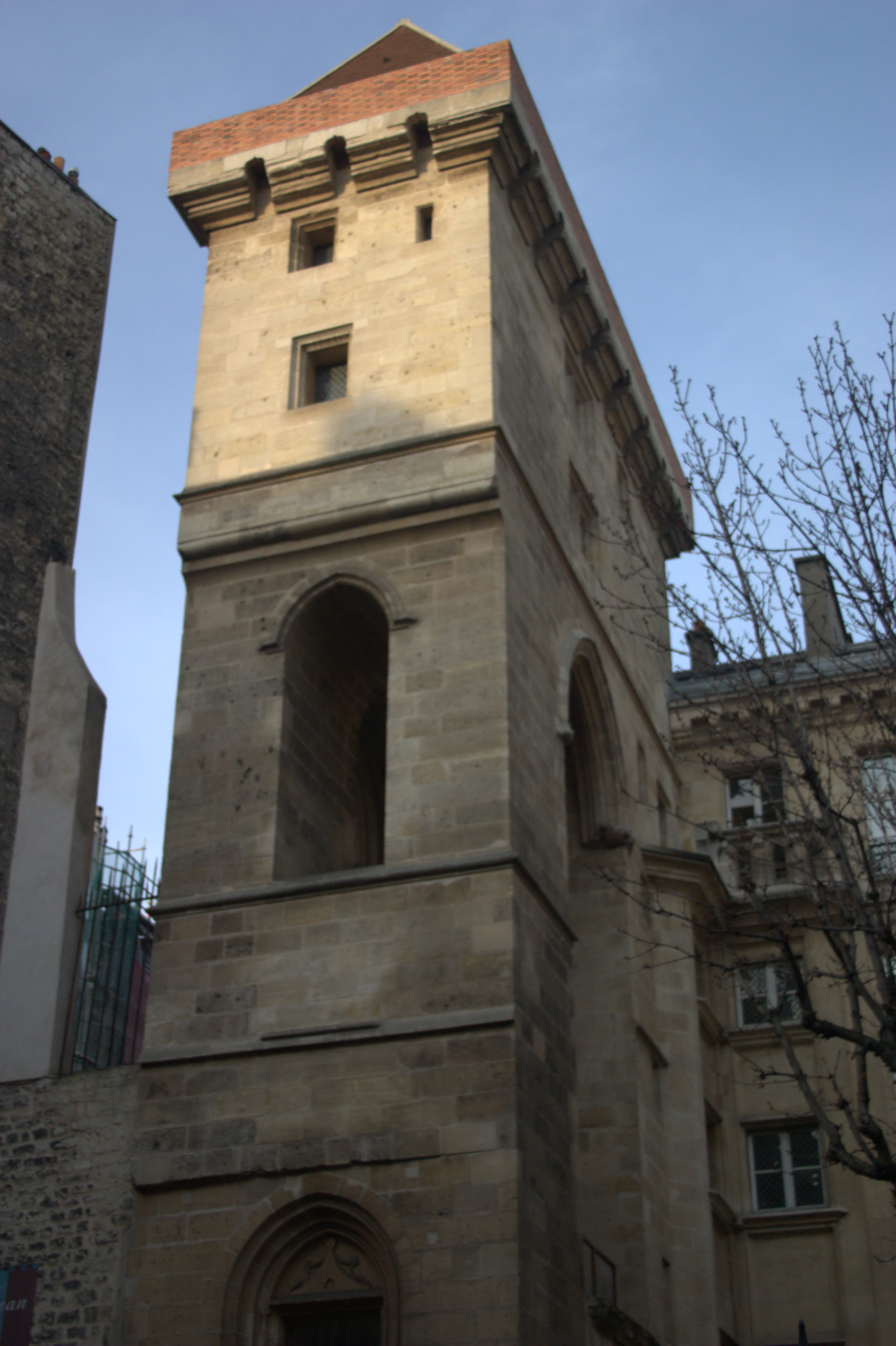
The Tour Jean-sans-Peur (1409–11) was part of the residence of the Dukes of Burgundy

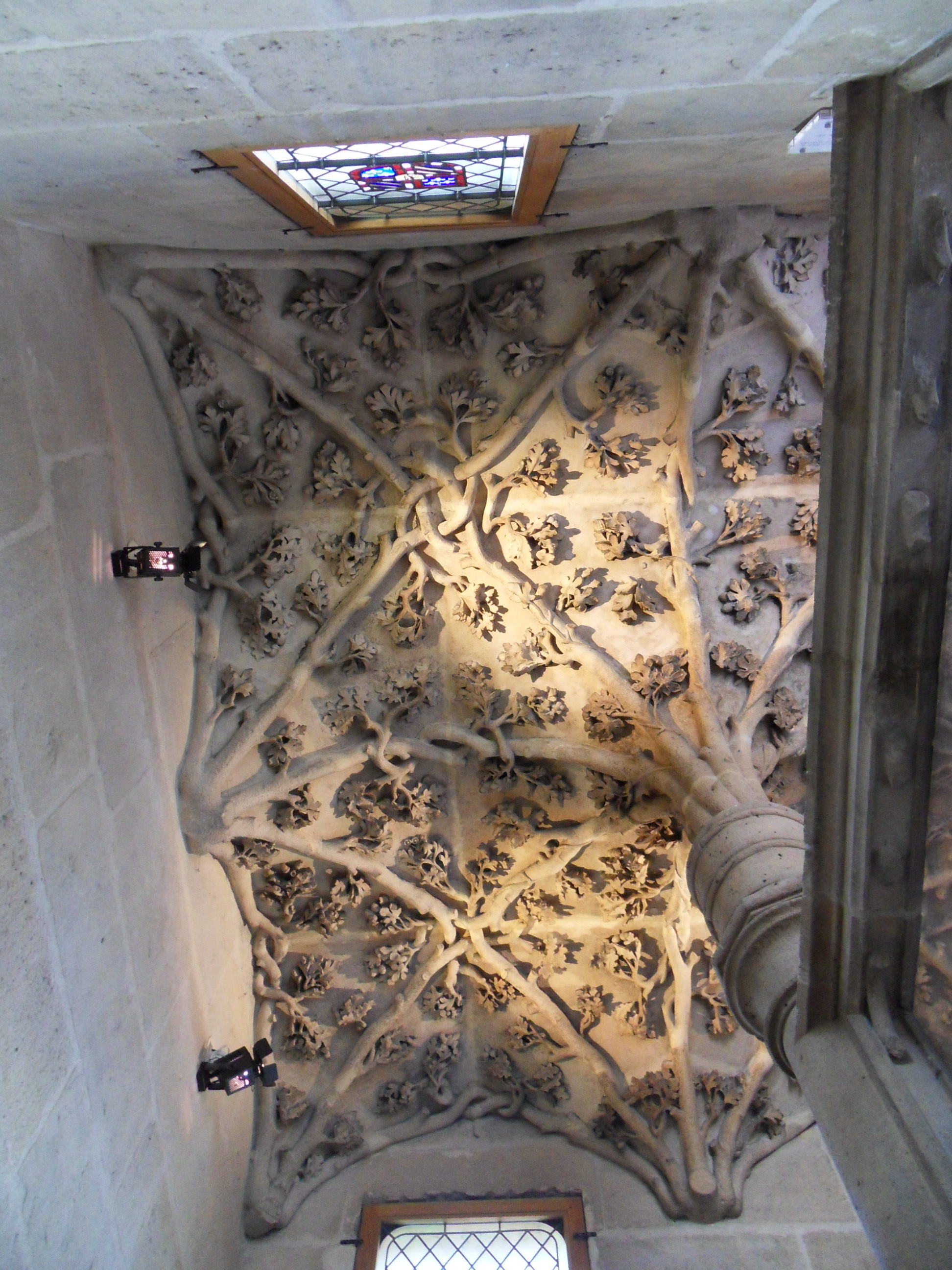
Flamboyant gothic vaulted ceiling from the tower of Jean-Sans-Peur (1409–11)

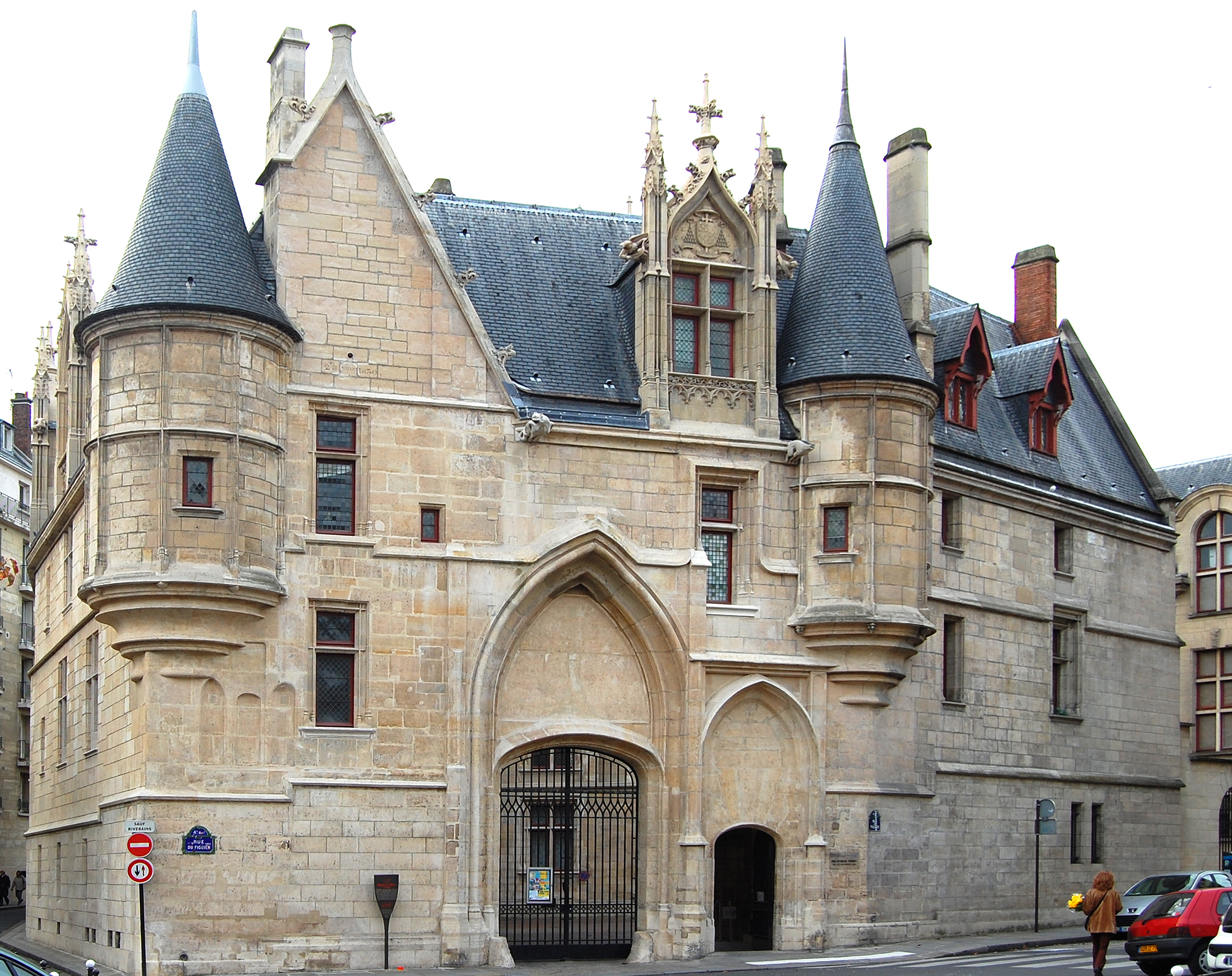
The Hôtel de Sens, residence of the Archbishop of Sens (1498)

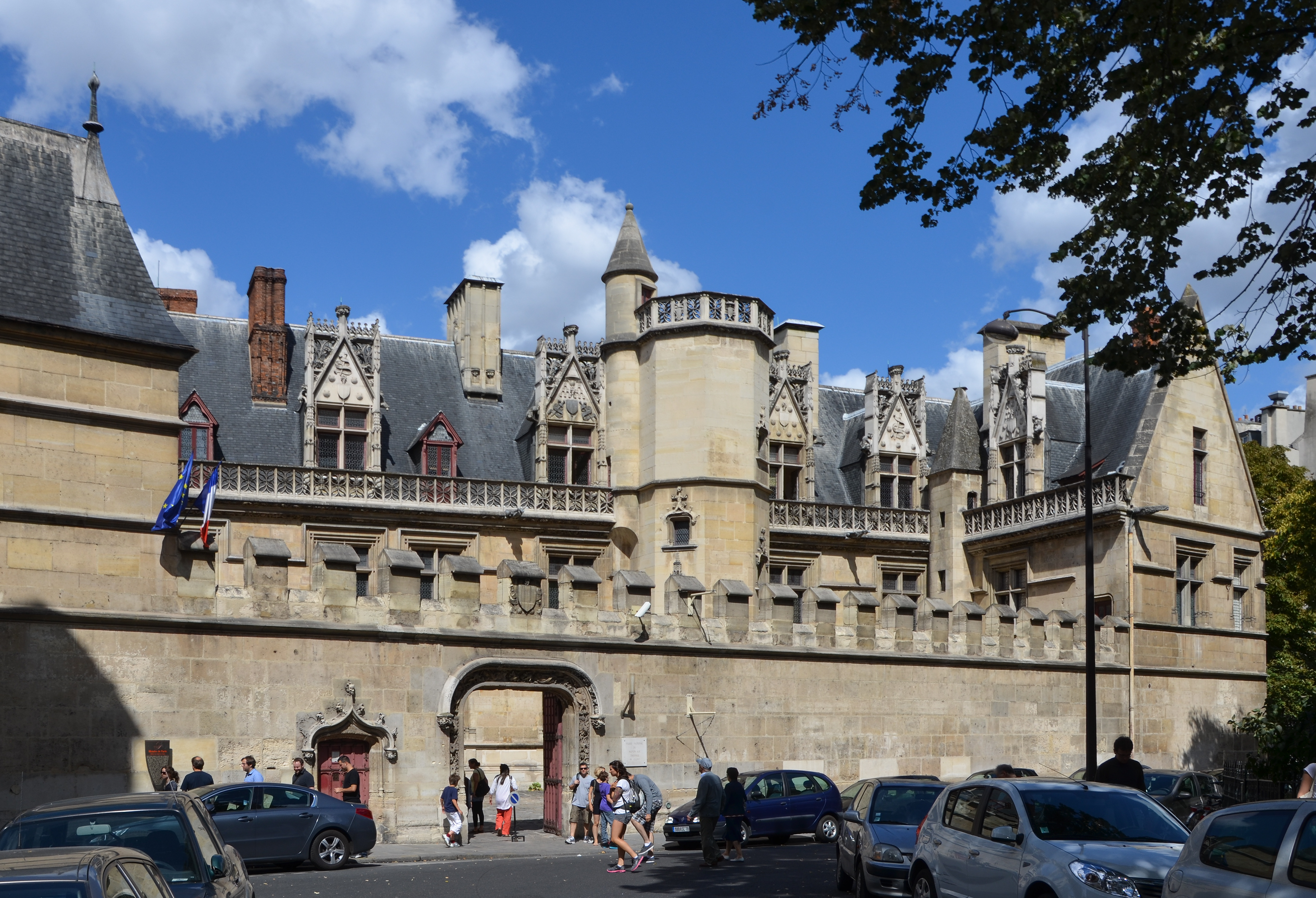
Courtyard of the Hôtel de Cluny, with its stairway in an exterior tower in the center (about 1500)

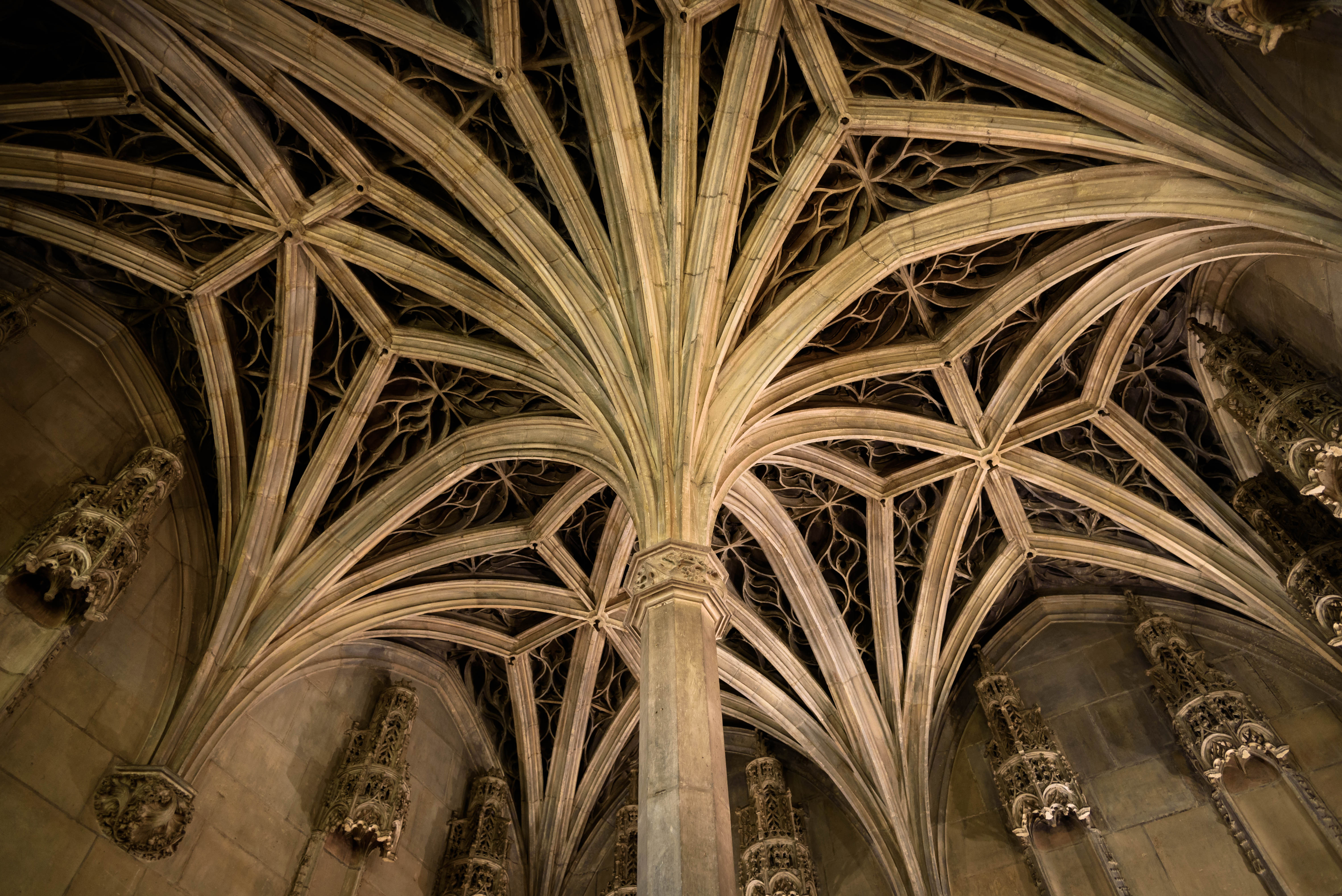
Flamboyant gothic vaulted ceiling from the chapel of the Hôtel de Cluny (about 1500)

The houses in Paris during the Middle Ages were tall and narrow; usually four or five stories. They were constructed of wooden beams on a stone foundation, with the walls covered by white plaster, to prevent fires. There was usually a shop located on the ground floor. Houses built of stone reserved for the wealthy; the oldest house in Paris is considered to be the Maison de Nicolas Flamel, at 51 rue Montmorency in the 3rd arrondissement, built in 1407. it was not a private residence, but a kind of hostel. Two houses with exposed beams at 13-15 rue François-Miron in the 4th arrondissement, often described as Medieval, were actually built in the 16th and 17th centuries.

While there are no ordinary houses from the Middle Ages, there are several examples of manors built for the nobility and the high clergy. The Tour Jean-sans-Peur, at 20 rue Étienne-Marcel in the 2nd arrondissement, built in 1409–11, was part of the Hôtel de Burgogne, the Paris residence of the Dukes of Burgundy. Built by Robert de Helbuterne, it contains a stairway with a magnificent flamboyant gothic ceiling. The Hôtel de Cluny residence of the abbots of the Cluny Monastery, now the Musée national du Moyen Âge or National Museum of the Middle Ages (1490–1500), has a typical feature of manors of the period; a stairway in a tower on the exterior of the building, in the courtyard. It also contains a chapel with a spectacular flamboyant Gothic ceiling. The Hôtel de Sens was the Paris residence of the Archbishop of Sens, who had authority over the Bishops of Paris. It also featured a separate stairway tower in the courtyard.

== Renaissance Paris (16th century) ==
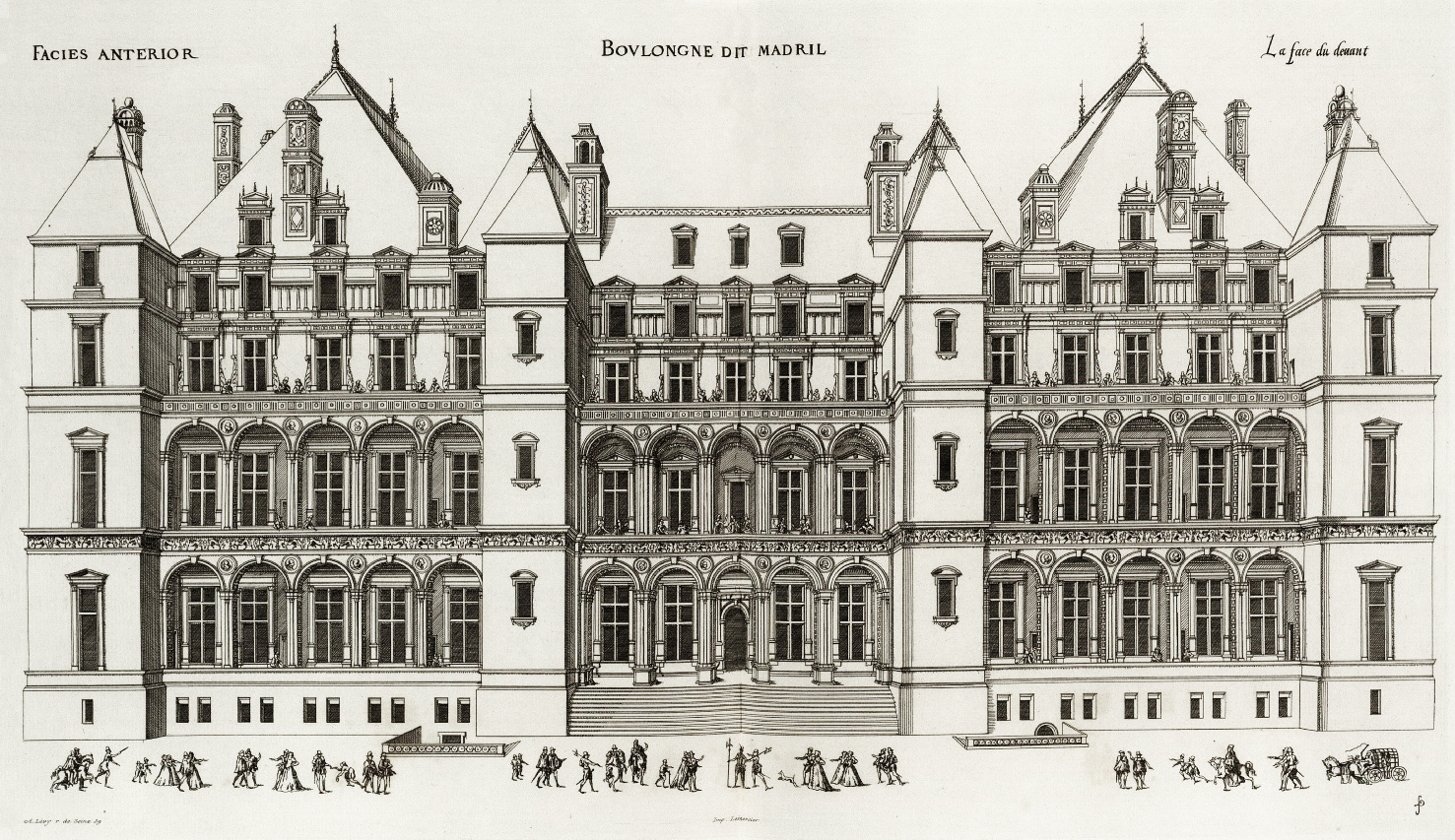
The Château de Madrid, built 1528–52, demolished in the 18th century

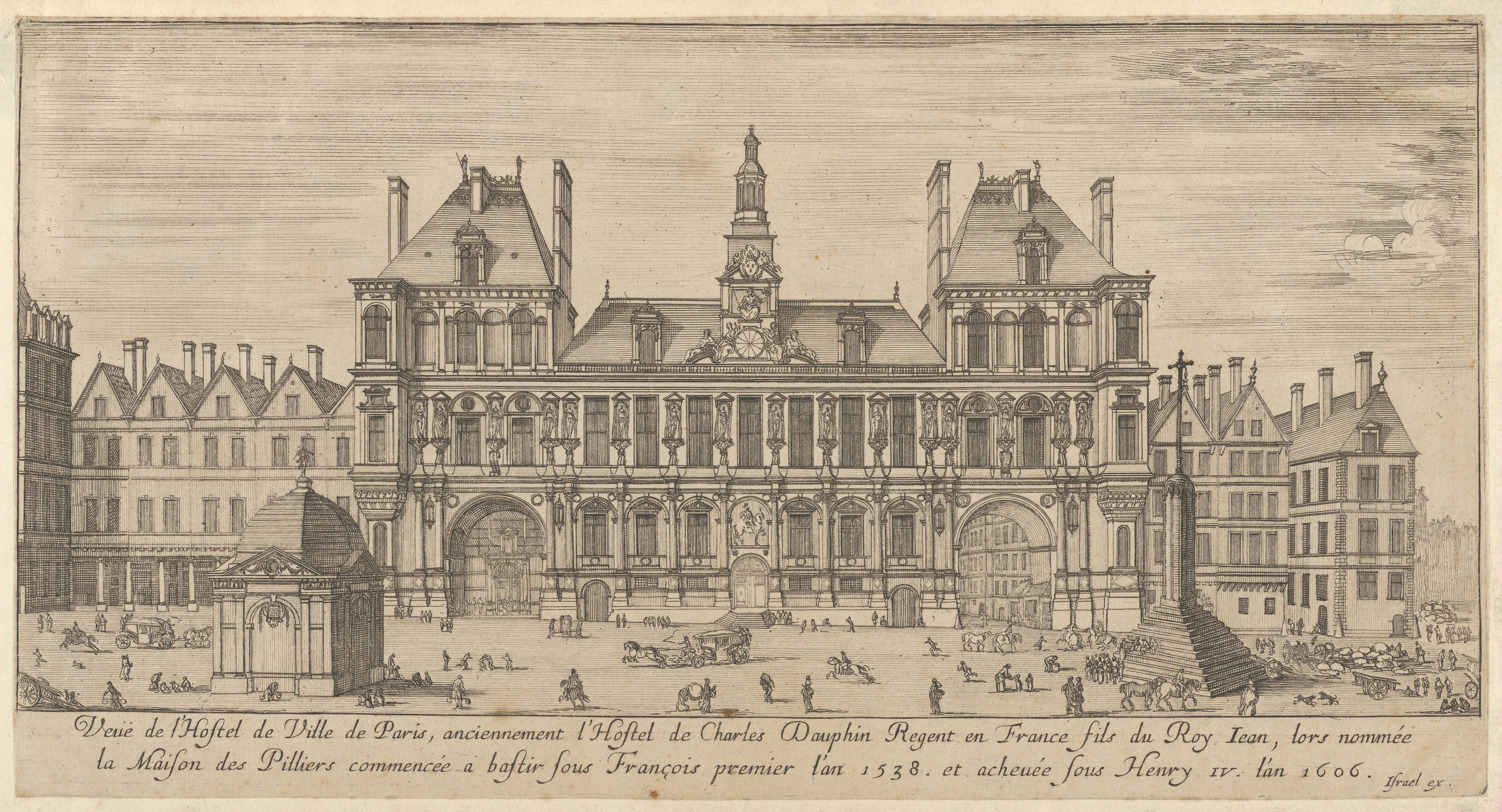
17th-century engraving of the Hotel de Ville, built 1533–1628, burned 1871, restored 1882.

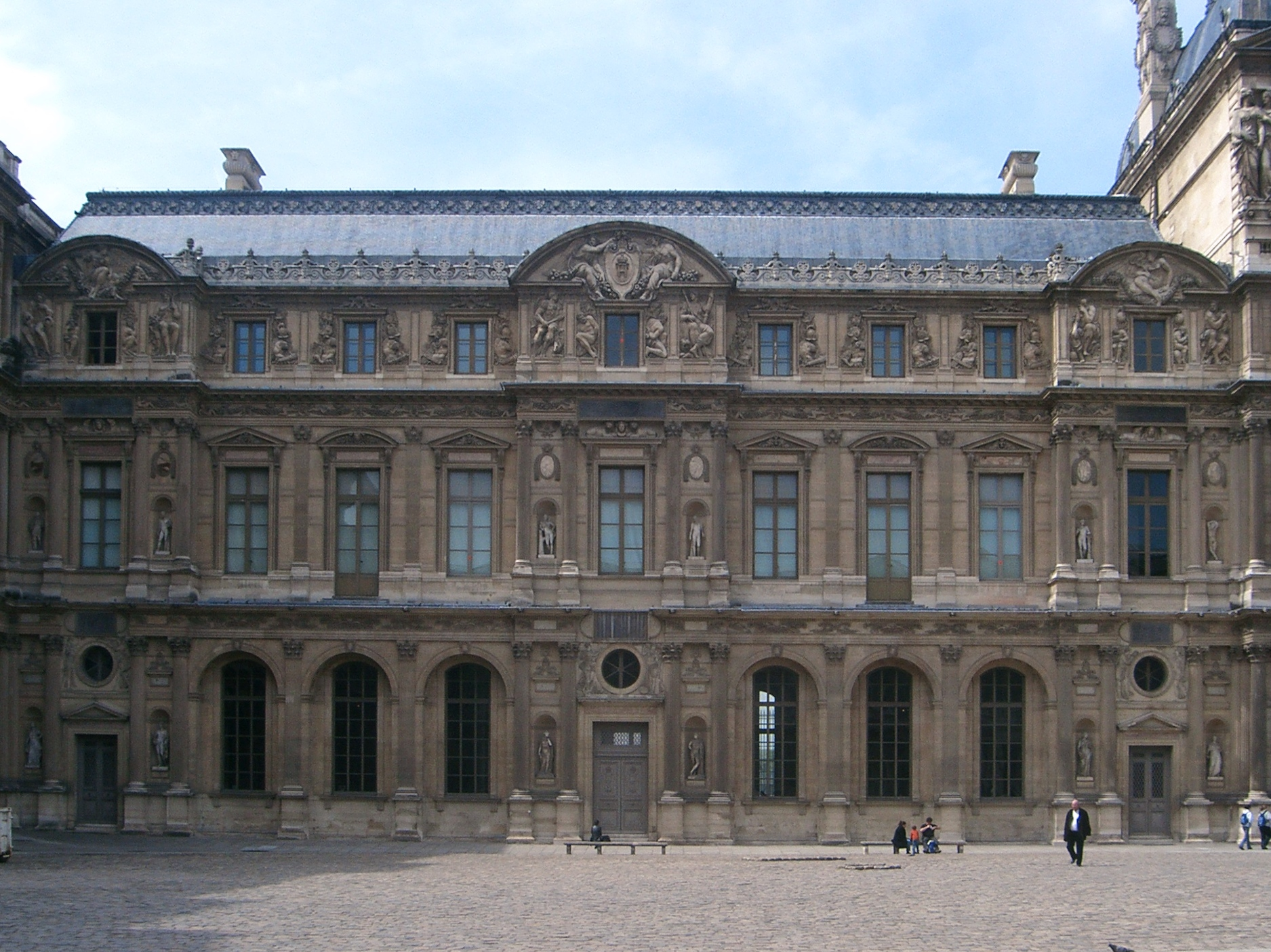
The Lescot wing of the Louvre, rebuilt by Francis I beginning in 1546 in the new French Renaissance style.

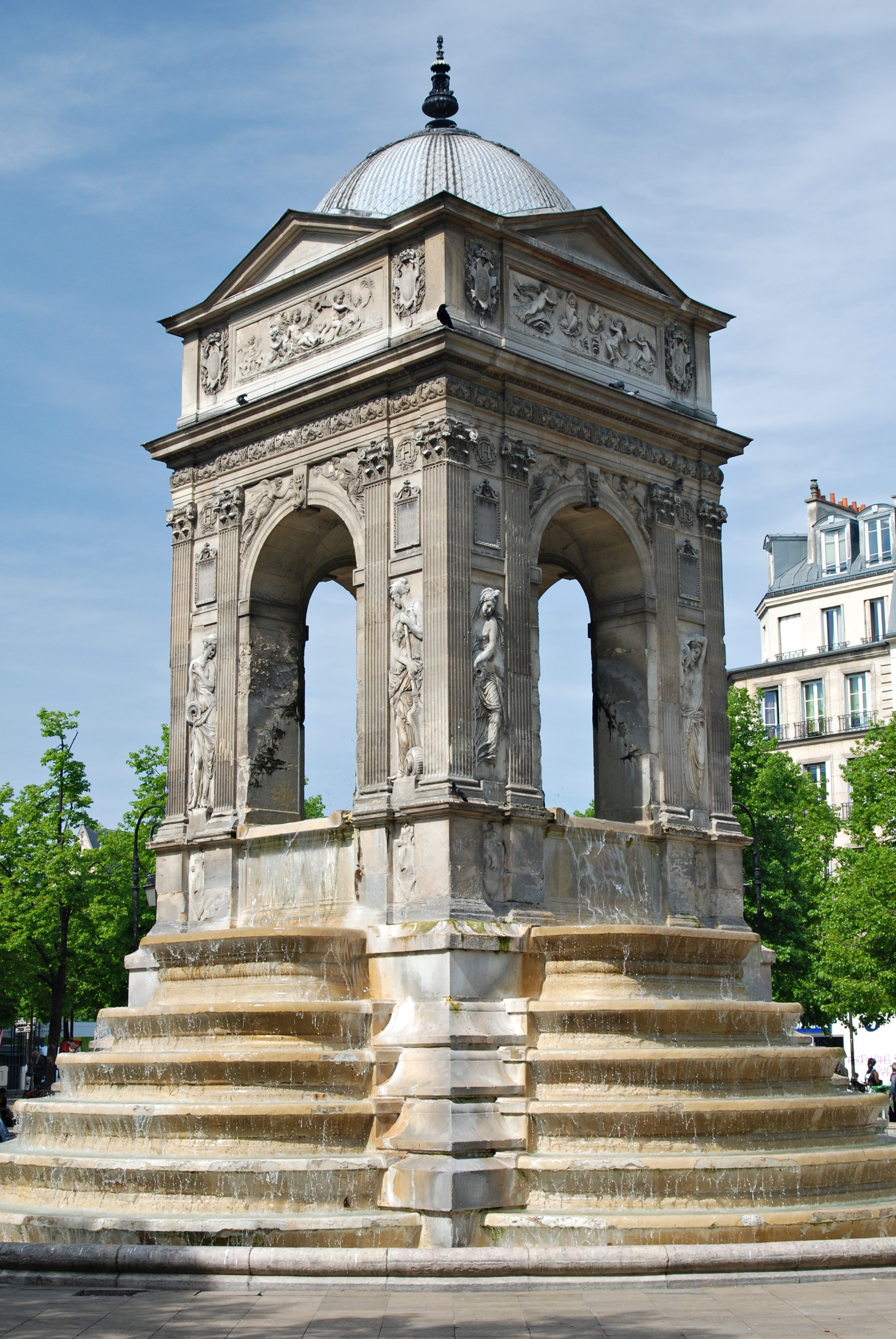
The Fontaine des Innocents (1549), next to the city market, celebrated the official entrance of king Henry II into Paris, by Pierre Lescot and Jean Goujon.

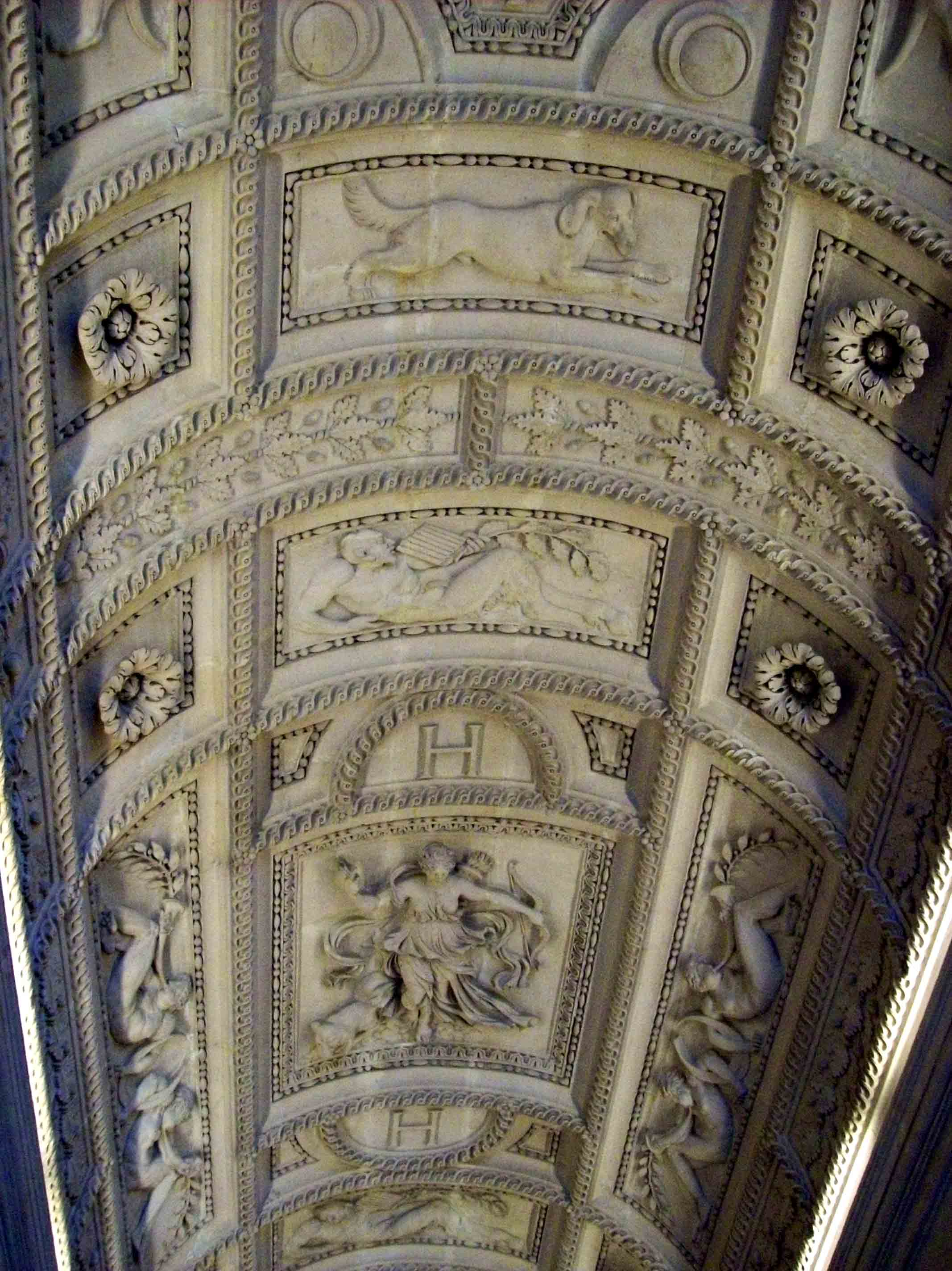
Ceiling of the stairway of Henri II in the Louvre (1546–53), by Pierre Lescot

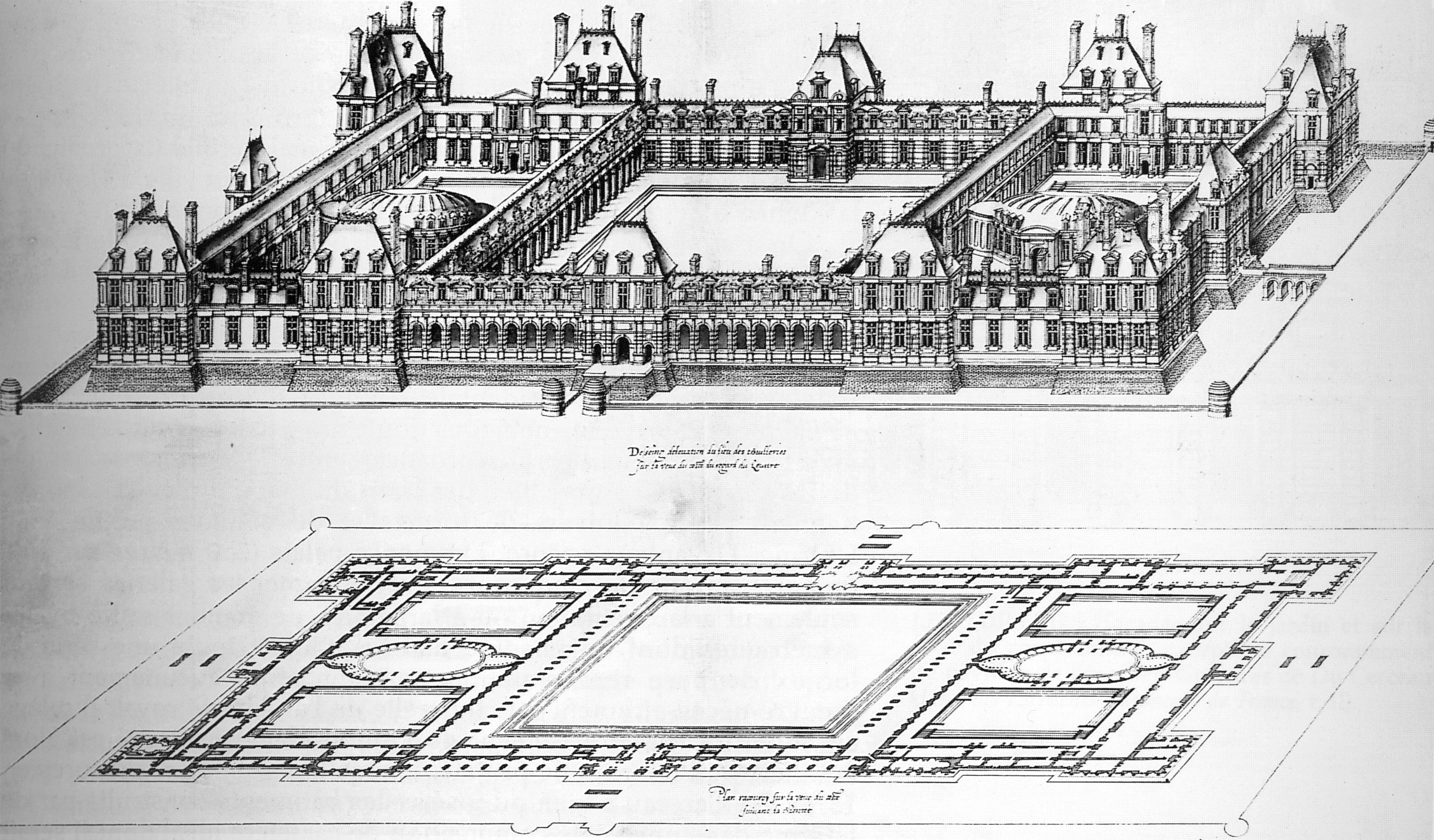
Project for enlargement of the Tuileries Palace (1578–79)

The Italian Wars conducted by Charles VIII and Louis XII, at the end of the 15th and early 16th century were not very successful from a military point of view, but had a direct and beneficial effect on the architecture of Paris. The two Kings returned to France with ideas for magnificent public architecture in the new Italian Renaissance style, and brought Italian architects to build them. A new manual of classical Roman architecture by the Italian Serlio also had a major effect on the new look of French buildings. A distinctly French Renaissance style, lavishly using cut stone and lavish ornamental sculpture, developed under Henry II after 1539.

The first structure in Paris in the new style was the old Pont Notre-Dame (1507–12), designed by the Italian architect Fra Giocondo. It was lined with 68 artfully designed houses, the first example of Renaissance urbanism. King Francis I commissioned the next project; a new Hôtel de Ville, or city hall, for the city. It was designed by another Italian, Domenico da Cortona, and begun in 1532 but not finished until 1628. The building was burned in 1871 by the Paris Commune, but the central portion was faithfully reconstructed in 1882. A monumental fountain in the Italian style, the Fontaine des Innocents, was built in 1549 as a tribune for the welcome of the new King, Henry II, to the city on June 16, 1549. It was designed by Pierre Lescot with sculpture by Jean Goujon, and is the oldest existing fountain in Paris.

The first Renaissance Palace built in Paris was the Château de Madrid; it was a large hunting lodge designed by Philibert Delorme and erected between 1528 and 1552 west of the city in what is now the Bois de Boulogne. It was combination of both French and Italian Renaissance styles, with a high French-style roof and Italian loggias. It was demolished beginning in 1787, but a fragment can still be seen today in the Trocadero Gardens in the 16th arrondissement.

Under Henry II and his successors, the Louvre was gradually transformed from a medieval fortress into a Renaissance palace. The architect Pierre Lescot and sculptor Jean Gouchon made the Lescot wing of the Louvre, a masterpiece of combined French and Italian Renaissance art and architecture, on the southeast side of the Cour Carrée of the Louvre (1546–53). Inside the Louvre, they made the staircase of Henry II (1546–53) and the Salle des Caryatides (1550). Both French and Italian elements were combined; the antique orders and paired columns of the Italian renaissance were combined with sculpted medallions and high roofs broken by windows (later known as the Mansard roof), which were characteristic of the French style.

After the accidental death of Henry II of France in 1559, his widow Catherine de' Medici (1519–1589) planned a new palace. She sold the medieval Hôtel des Tournelles, where her husband had died, and began building the Tuileries Palace in using architect Philibert de l'Orme. During the reign of Henry IV (1589–1610), the building was enlarged to the south, so it joined the long riverside gallery, the Grande Galerie, which ran all the way to the older Louvre Palace in the east.

=== Religious architecture ===
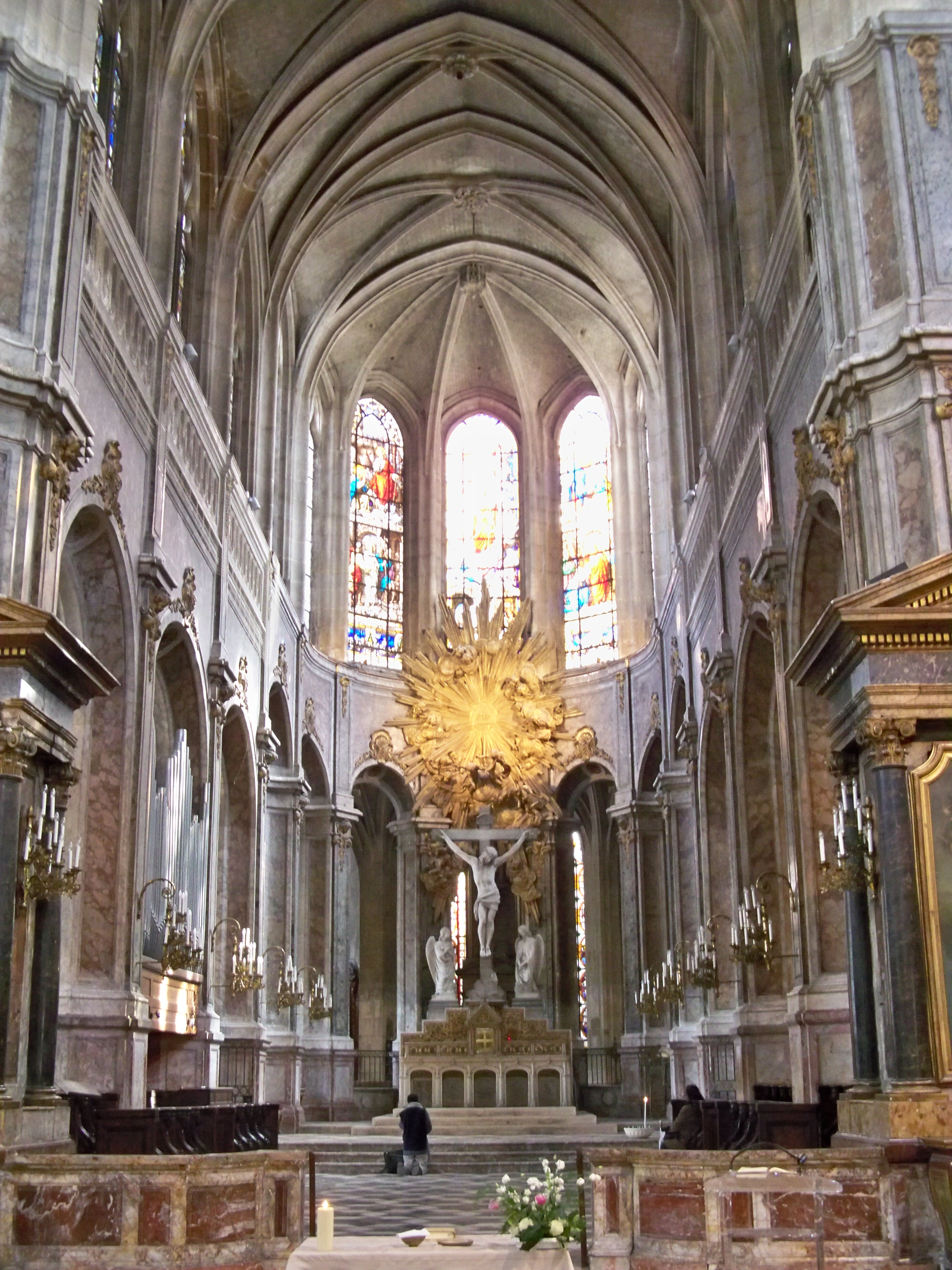
Interior of Saint-Merri (1520–52)

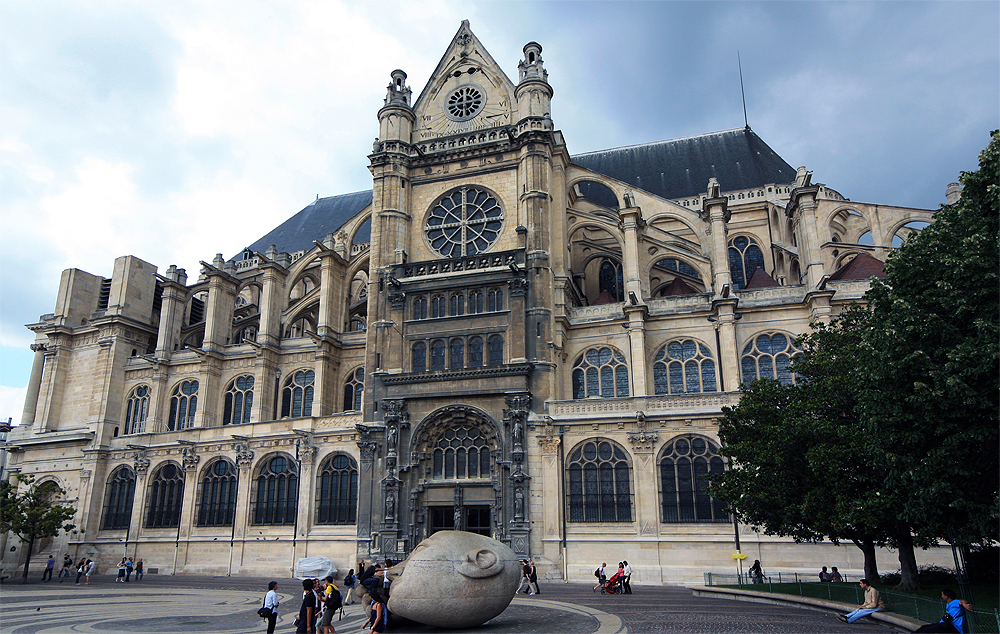
Saint-Eustache (1532–1640), a gothic church overlaid with Renaissance ornament

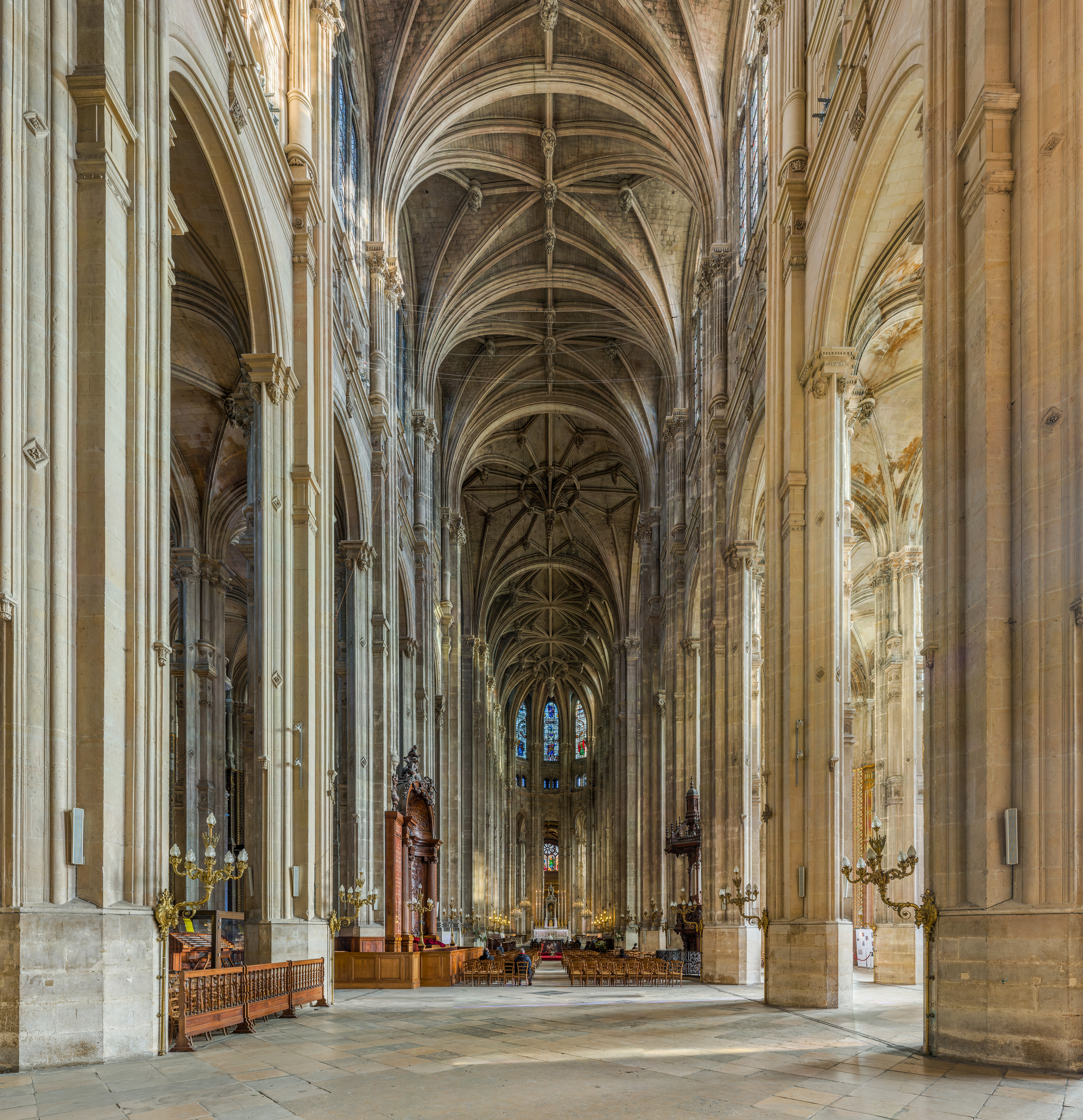
Interior of Saint-Eustache

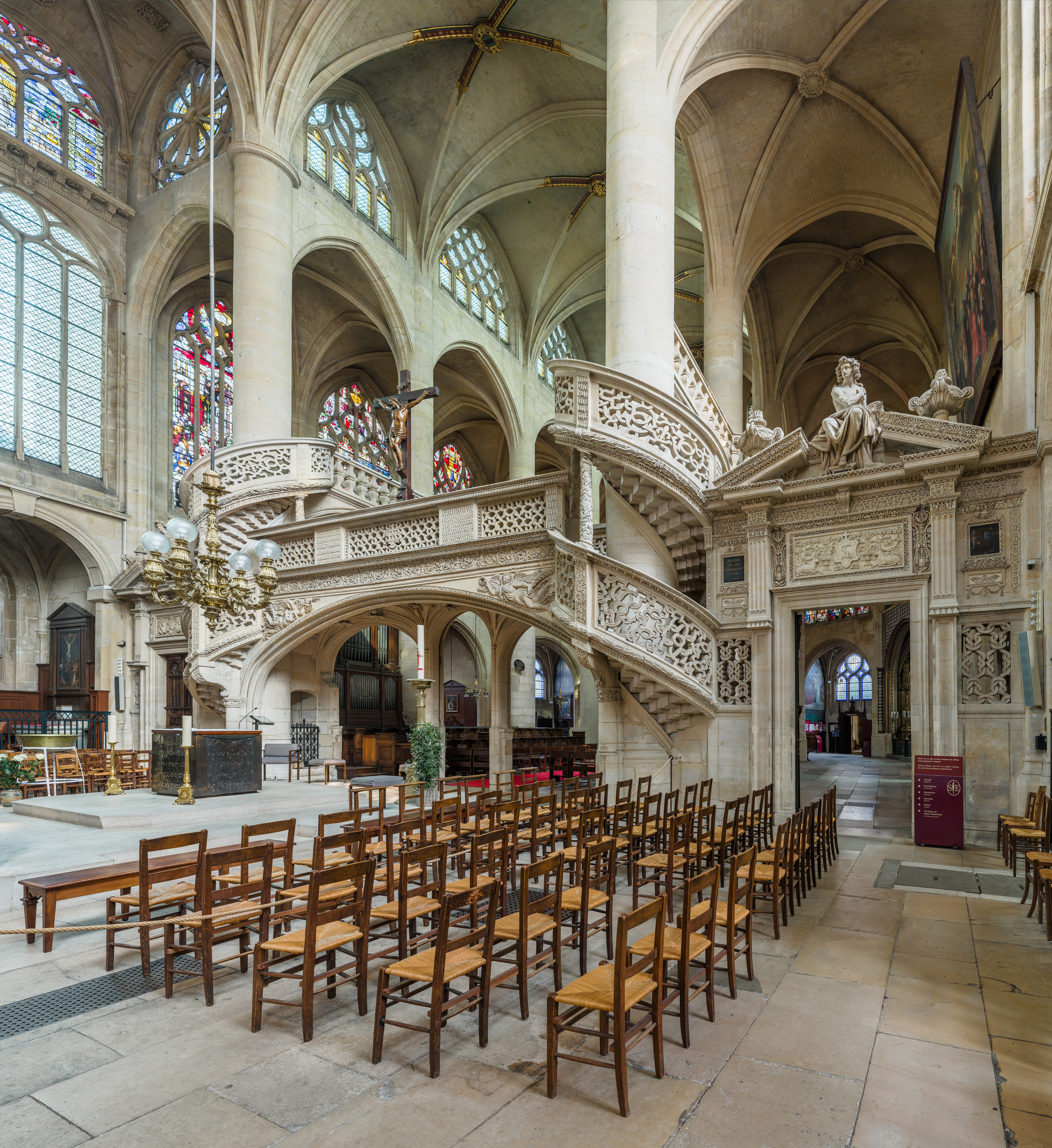
The rood screen in the interior Saint-Étienne-du-Mont (1510–86)

Most of the churches built in Paris in the 16th century are in the traditional Flamboyant style, though some have features borrowed from the Italian Renaissance. The most important Paris church of the Renaissance is Saint-Eustache, 105 meters long, 44 meters wide and 35 meters high, which in size and grandeur, approaches that of the Cathedral of Notre-Dame. King Francis I wanted a monument as the centrepiece for the neighborhood of Les Halles, where the main city market was located. The church was designed by the King's favorite architect, Domenico da Cortona. The project was begun in 1519, and construction began in 1532. The pillars were inspired by the monastery church of Cluny, and the soaring interior is taken from the gothic cathedrals of the 13th century, but Cortona added details and ornament taken from the Italian Renaissance. It was not completed until 1640.

The other churches of the period follow the more traditional flamboyant Gothic models. They include Saint-Merri (1520–52), with a plan similar to Notre-Dame; Saint-Germain l'Auxerrois, which features impressive flying buttresses; and the Église Saint-Medard. whose choir was built in beginning in 1550; St-Gervais-et-St-Protais features a soaring gothic vault in the apse, but also had a transept a more sober classical style inspired by the Renaissance. (The baroque façade was added in the 17th century).in the Saint-Étienne-du-Mont (1510–86), near the modern Pantheon on Mont Sainte-Genevieve, has the only remaining Renaissance rood screen (1530–35), a magnificent bridge across the center of the church. The flamboyant gothic church of Saint-Nicholas-des-Champs (1559) has a striking Renaissance feature; a portal on right side inspired by designs of Philibert Delorme for the former royal residence, the Palace of Tournelles in the Marais.

=== Houses and hôtels particuliers ===
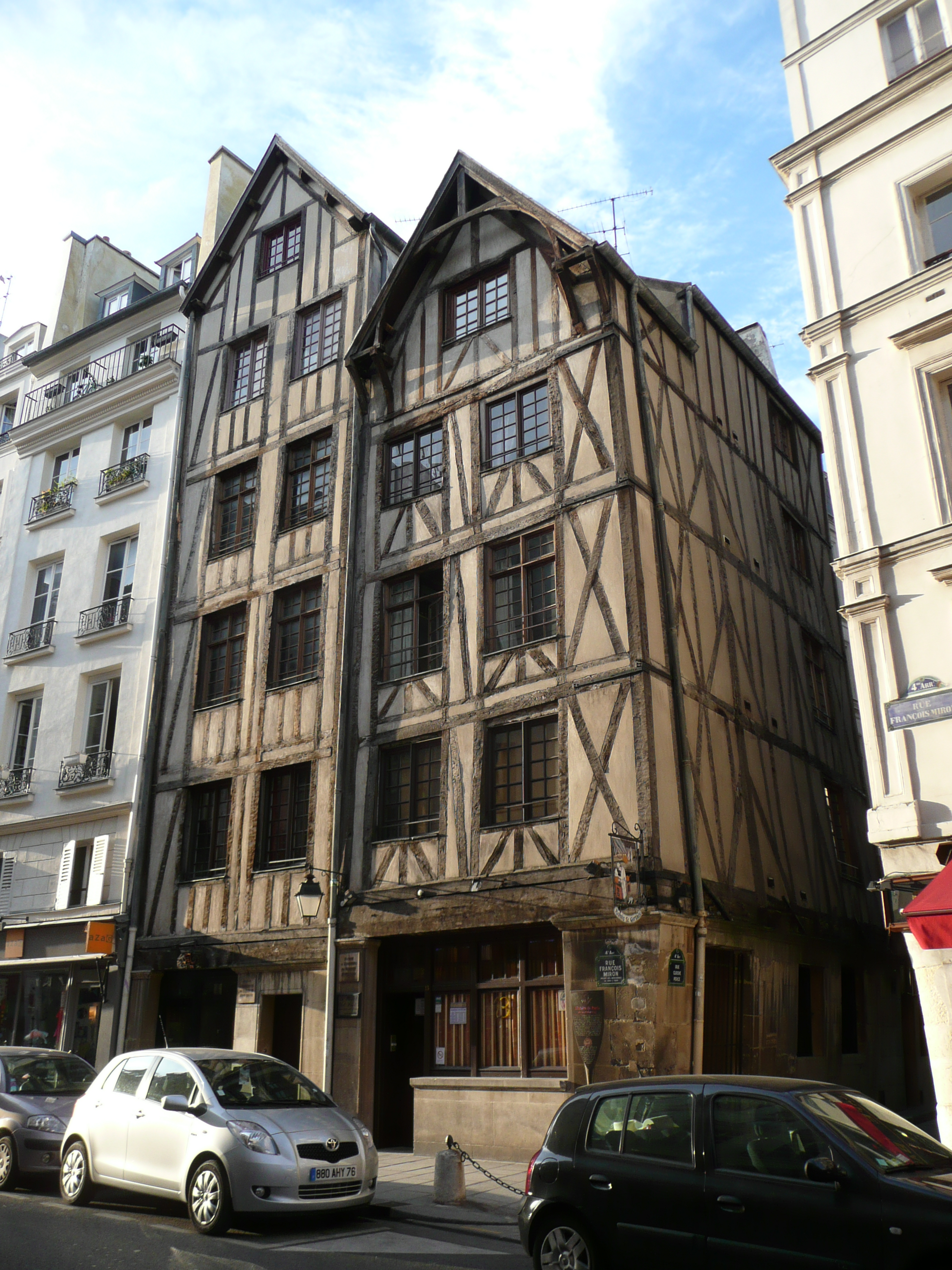
Houses at 13-15 rue Francois-Miron, 4th arrondissement (16th–17th centuries)

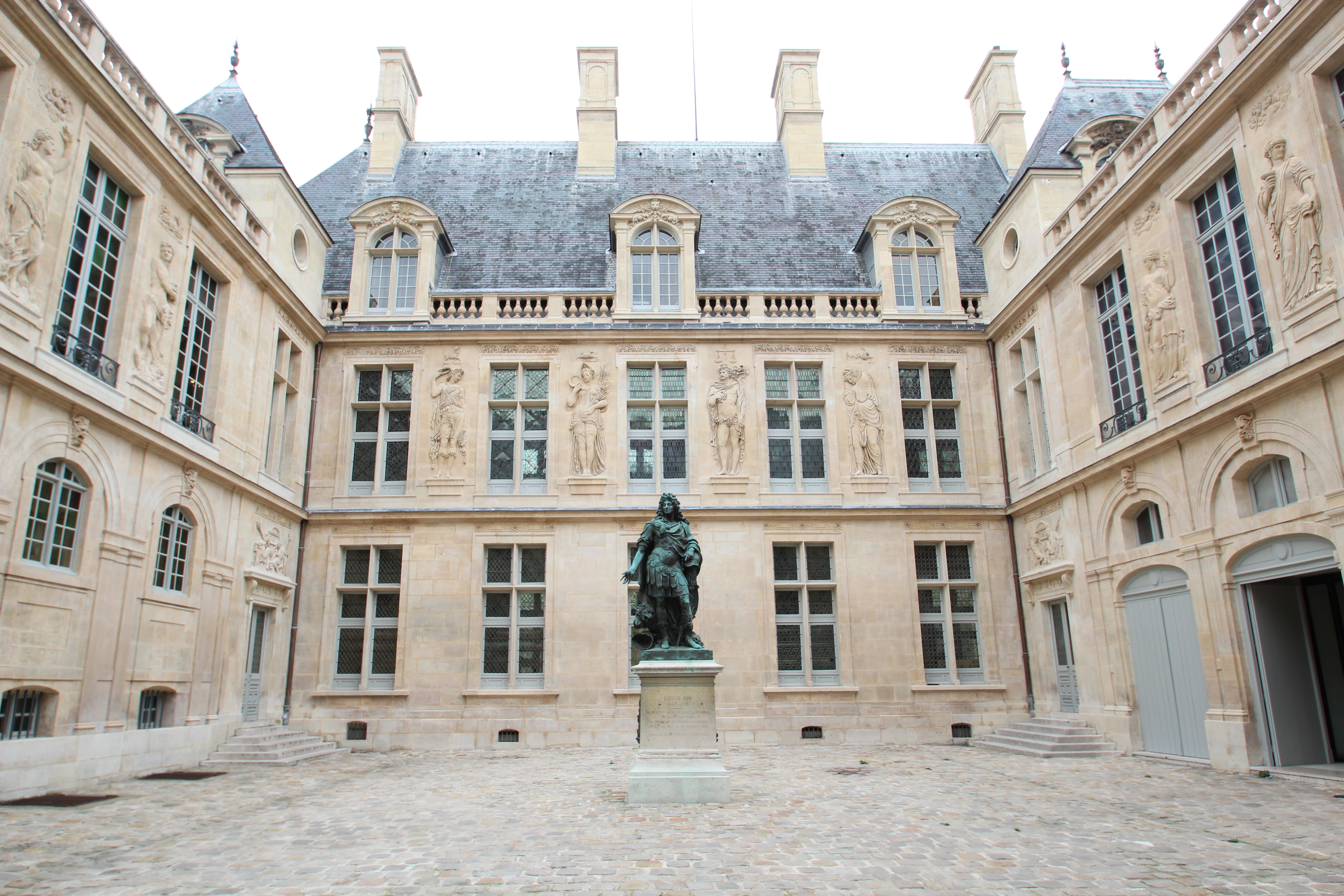
Facade of the Carnavalet Museum (1547–48), with sculpture by Jean Goujon

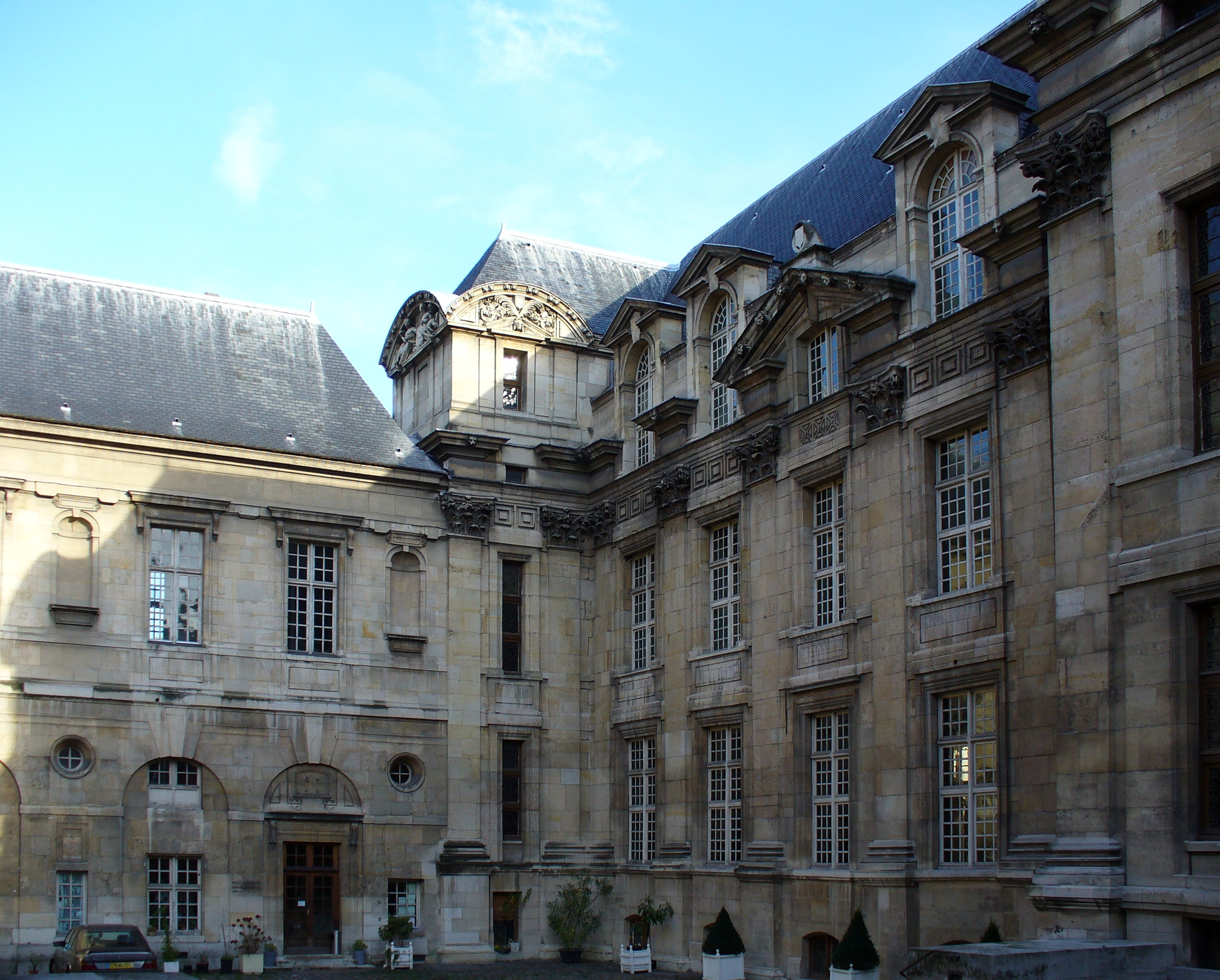
The Hôtel d'Angoulême Lamoignon, at 24 rue Pavée in the Marais. (1585–89), now the library of the history of Paris

The ordinary Paris house of the Renaissance was little changed from the medieval house; they were four to five stories high, narrow, built on a stone foundation of wood covered with plaster. They usually had a "pigeon", or gabled roof. The two houses at 13–15 rue François Miron (actually built in the 16th or 17th century, but often described as medieval houses) are good examples of the Renaissance house.

Once the French court returned to Paris from the Loire Valley, the nobility and wealthy merchants began to build hôtels particuliers, or large private residences, mostly in the Marais. They were built of stone and richly decorated with sculpture. They were usually built around a courtyard, and separated from the street. The residence was a located between the courtyard and garden. The façade facing the courtyard had the most sculptural decoration; the façade facing the garden was usually rough stone. The Hôtel Carnavalet at 23 rue de Sévigné, (1547–49), designed by Pierre Lescot, and decorated with sculpture by Jean Goujon, is the best example of a Renaissance hôtel. As the century advanced, the exterior stairways disappeared and the façades became more classical and regular. A good example of the later style is the Hôtel d'Angoulême Lamoignon, at 24 rue Pavée in the 3rd arrondissement (1585–89), designed by Thibaut Métezeau.

== The 17th century – The Baroque, the dome, and the debut of Classicism ==
The architectural style of the French Renaissance continued to dominate in Paris through the Regency of Marie de' Medici. The end of the wars of religion allowed the continuation of several building projects, such as the expansion of the Louvre, begun in the 16th century but abandoned because of the war. With the arrival in power Louis XIII and the ministers Richelieu and Mazarin, a new architectural style, the Baroque, imported from Italy, began to appear in Paris. Its purpose, like Baroque music and painting, was to awe Parisians with its majesty and ornament, in opposition to the austere style of the Protestant Reformation. The new style in Paris was characterized by opulence, irregularity, and an abundance of decoration. The straight geometric lines of the buildings were covered with curved or triangular frontons, niches with statues or caryatids, cartouches, garlands of drapery, and cascades of fruit carved from stone.

Louis XIV distrusted the unruly Parisians and spent as little time as possible in Paris, finally moving his Court to Versailles, but at the same time he wanted to transform Paris into "The New Rome", a city worthy of the Sun King. Over the course of his long reign, from 1643 until 1715, the architectural style in Paris gradually changed from the exuberance of the Baroque to a more solemn and formal classicism, the embodiment in stone of the King's vision of Paris as "the new Rome." The new Académie royale d'architecture, founded in 1671, imposed an official style, as the Academies of art and literature had earlier done. The style was modified again beginning in about 1690, as the government began to run short of money; new projects were less grandiose.

=== Royal squares and urban planning ===
Residential Squares
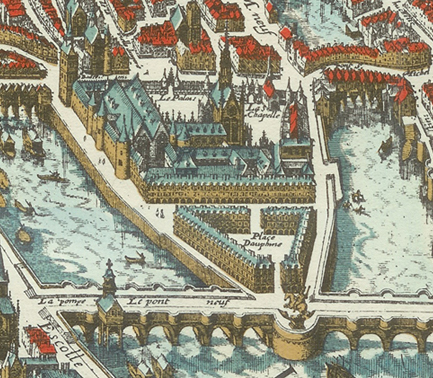
Place Dauphine and the newly finished Pont Neuf in 1615

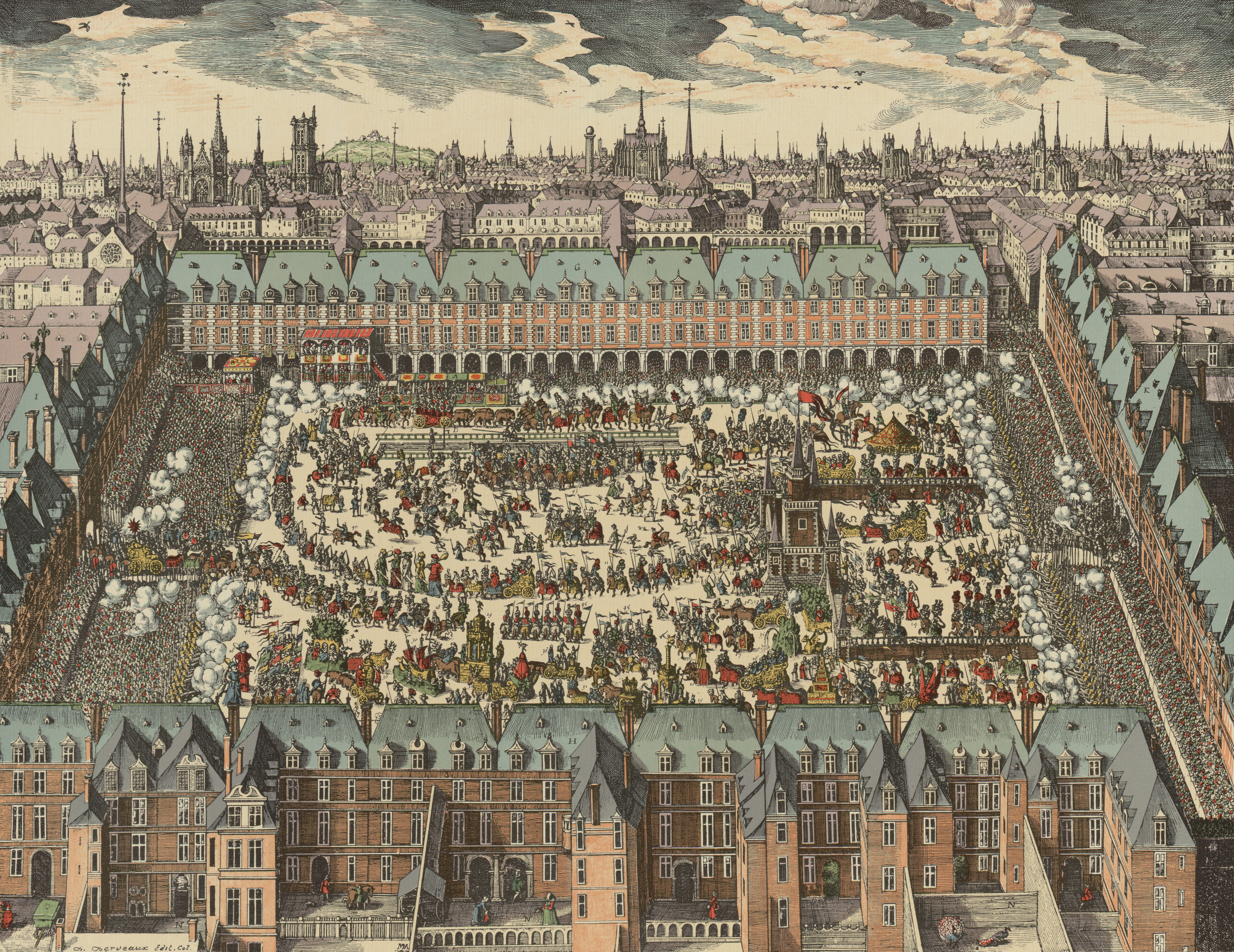
The Place Royale (now Place des Vosges) in 1612

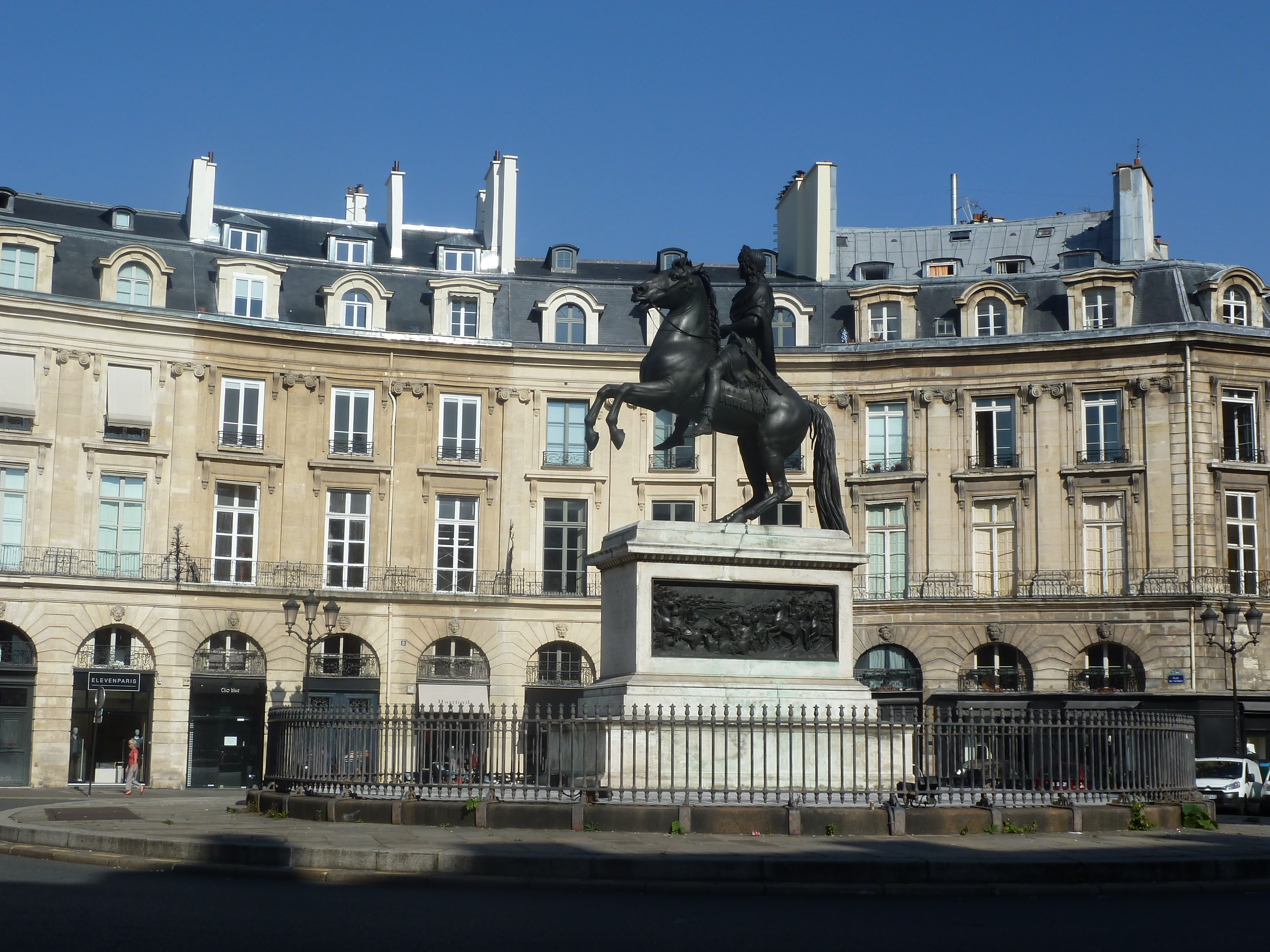
Place des Victoires (1684–97) by Jules Hardouin-Mansart

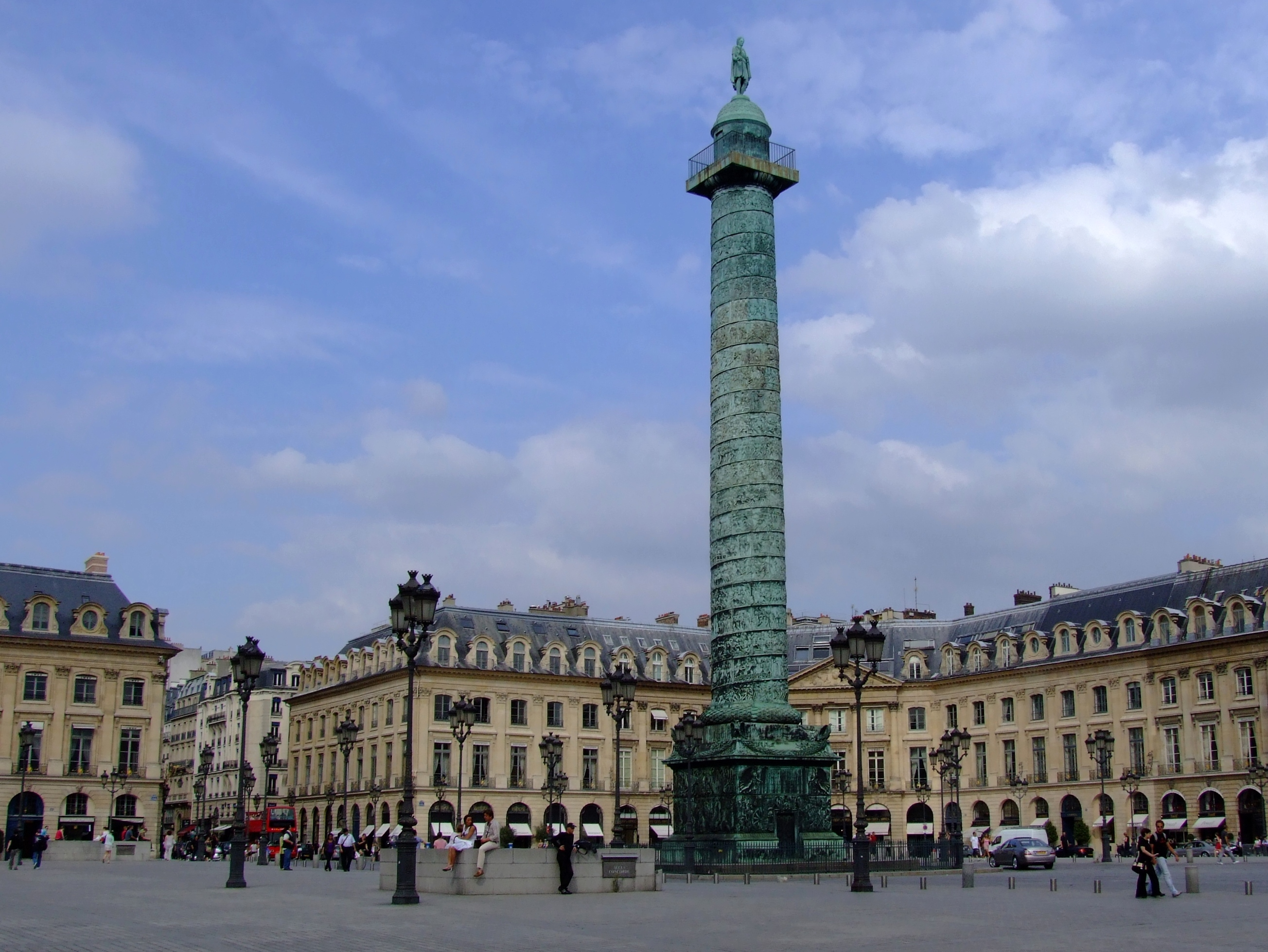
Place Vendôme (1699–1702), by Jules Hardouin-Mansart

In the 17th century, the first large-scale urban planning of Paris was initiated by royal ordinance, largely based on the model of Italian cities, including the construction of the first residential squares. The first two squares, Place Royale (now Place des Vosges, 1605–12) and Place Dauphine, the latter in place of the old royal garden on the Île-de-la-Cité, were both begun by Henry IV, who also completed the first Paris bridge without houses, the Pont Neuf (1599–1604). The Place Royale had nine large residences on each of its four sides, with identical façades. The Place Dauphine had forty houses on its three sides (of which just two remain today). Louis XIV continued the style with Place des Victoires (1684–97) and Place Vendôme (1699–1702). Both of these squares were (1) designed by Jules Hardouin-Mansart, (2) had statues of the King in the center, and (3) were financed largely by the sale of the houses around the squares. The residences around the latter two squares had identical classical façades and were built of stone, following Hardouin-Mansart's Grand Style used in his monumental buildings. The residential squares all had pedestrian arcades on the ground floors, and what became known as a mansart window breaking the line of the high roof. They set a model for European squares in the 18th century.

Urban planning was another important legacy of the 17th century. In 1667 formal height limits were imposed on Paris buildings; 48 pieds (15.6 metres (51 ft)) for wooden buildings and 50 to 60 pieds (16.25 to 19.50 metres (53.3 to 64.0 ft)) for buildings of stone, following earlier rules set in place in 1607. To prevent fires, the traditional gabled roof was banned. Beginning in 1669, under the new regulations, large blocks of houses of uniform height and uniform façades were built along several Paris streets on the right bank, notably rue de la Ferronnerie (1st arr.), rue Saint-Honoré (1st arr.), rue du Mail (2nd arr.), and rue Saint-Louis-en-Île on the Île Saint-Louis. They usually were built of stone and composed of an arched arcade on the ground floor with two to four stories above, the windows separated by decorative columns, and a high roof broken by rows of windows. This was the birth of the iconic Paris street architecture that dominated for the next two centuries.

Another element of the new architecture of Paris was the bridge. The Pont Neuf (1599–1604) and Pont Royal (1685–89), by engineer François Romain and architect Jules Hardouin-Mansart, were built without the rows of houses that occupied earlier bridges, and were designed to match the grand style of the architecture around them.

=== Palaces and monuments ===
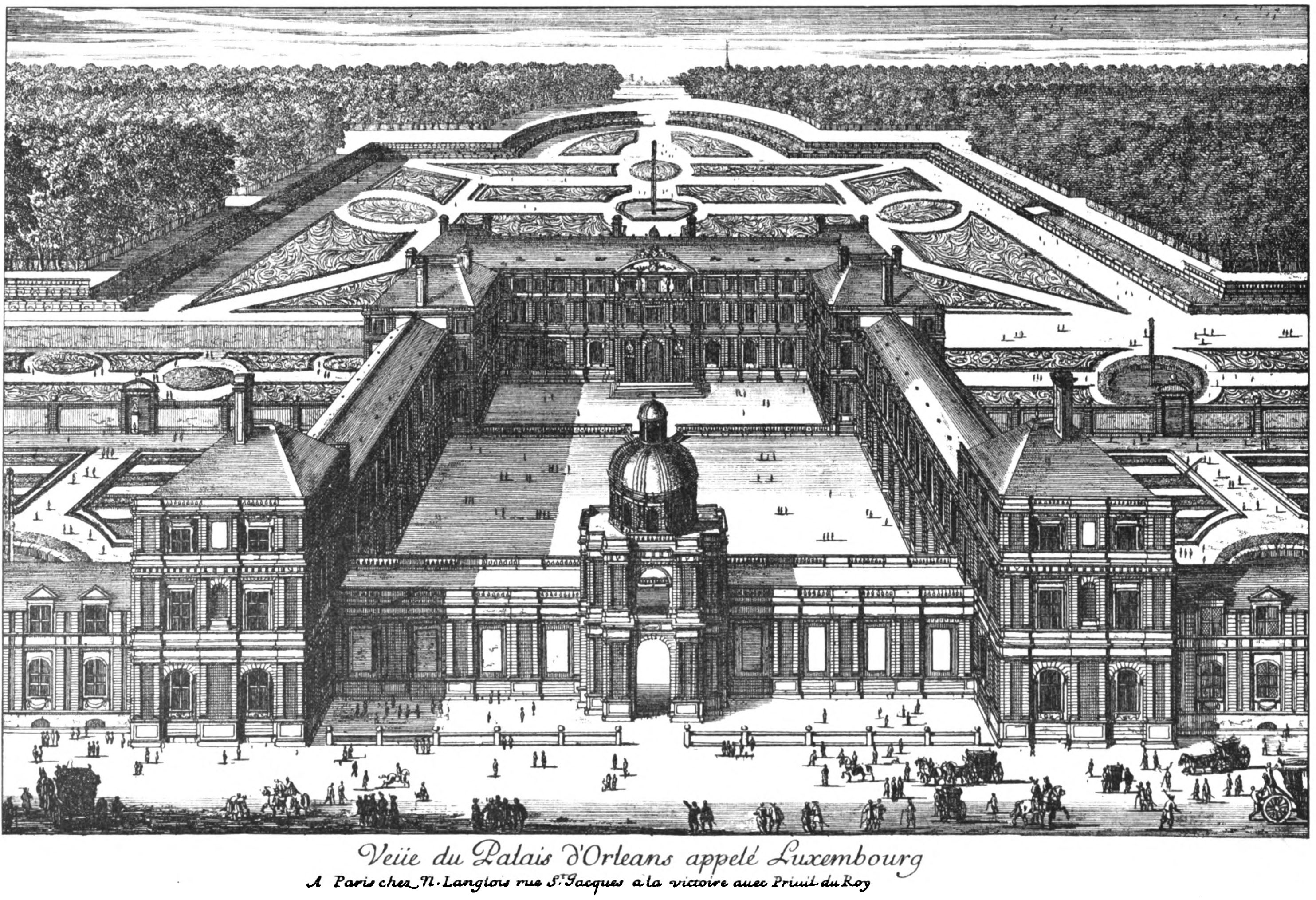
The Luxembourg Palace in 1643

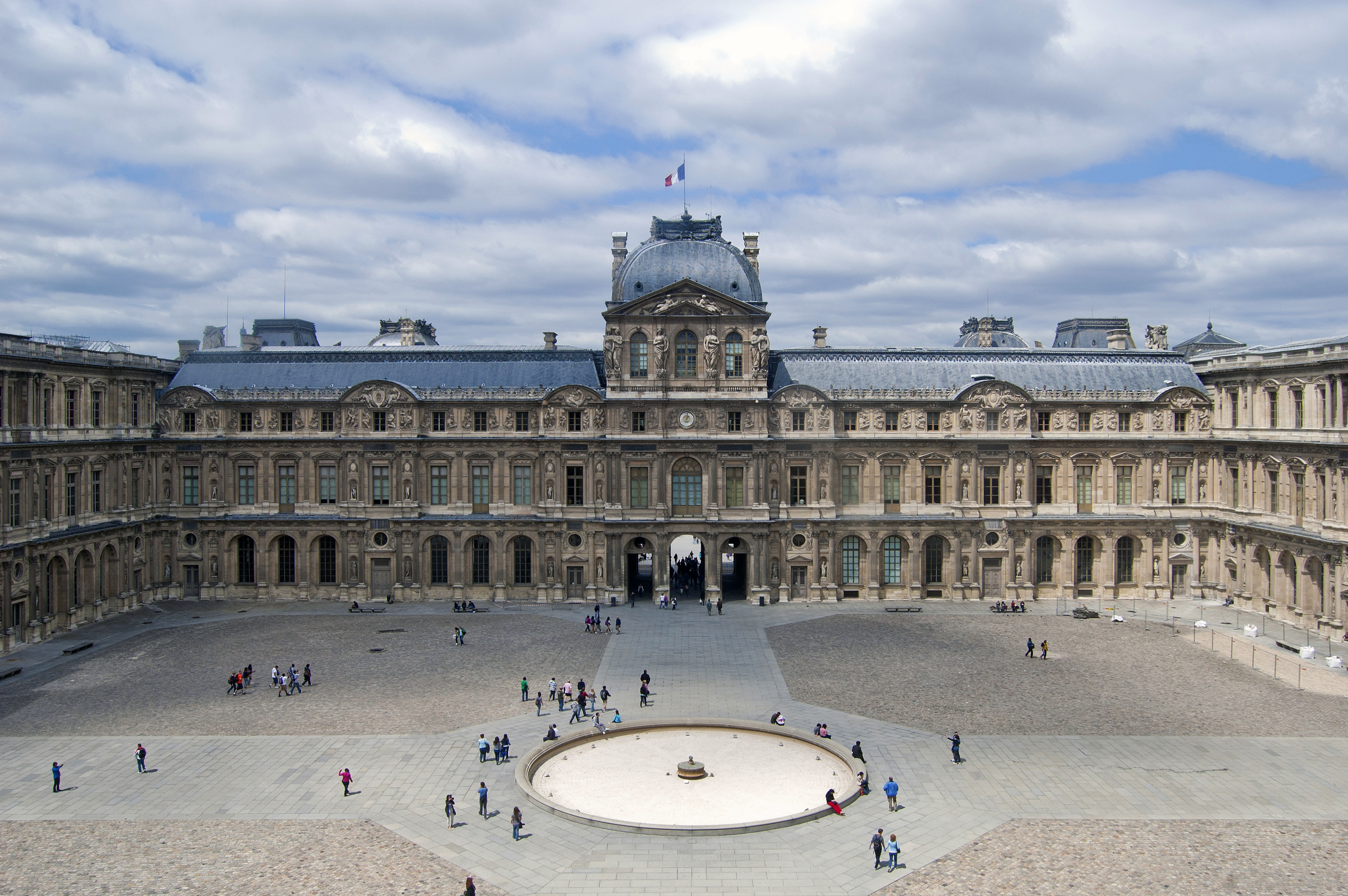
The Lescot wing from 1546 to 1553 (left of the tower) and Lemercier wing from 1624 to 1639) (right of the tower) in the interior of the Cour Carrée of the Louvre, in the Renaissance style

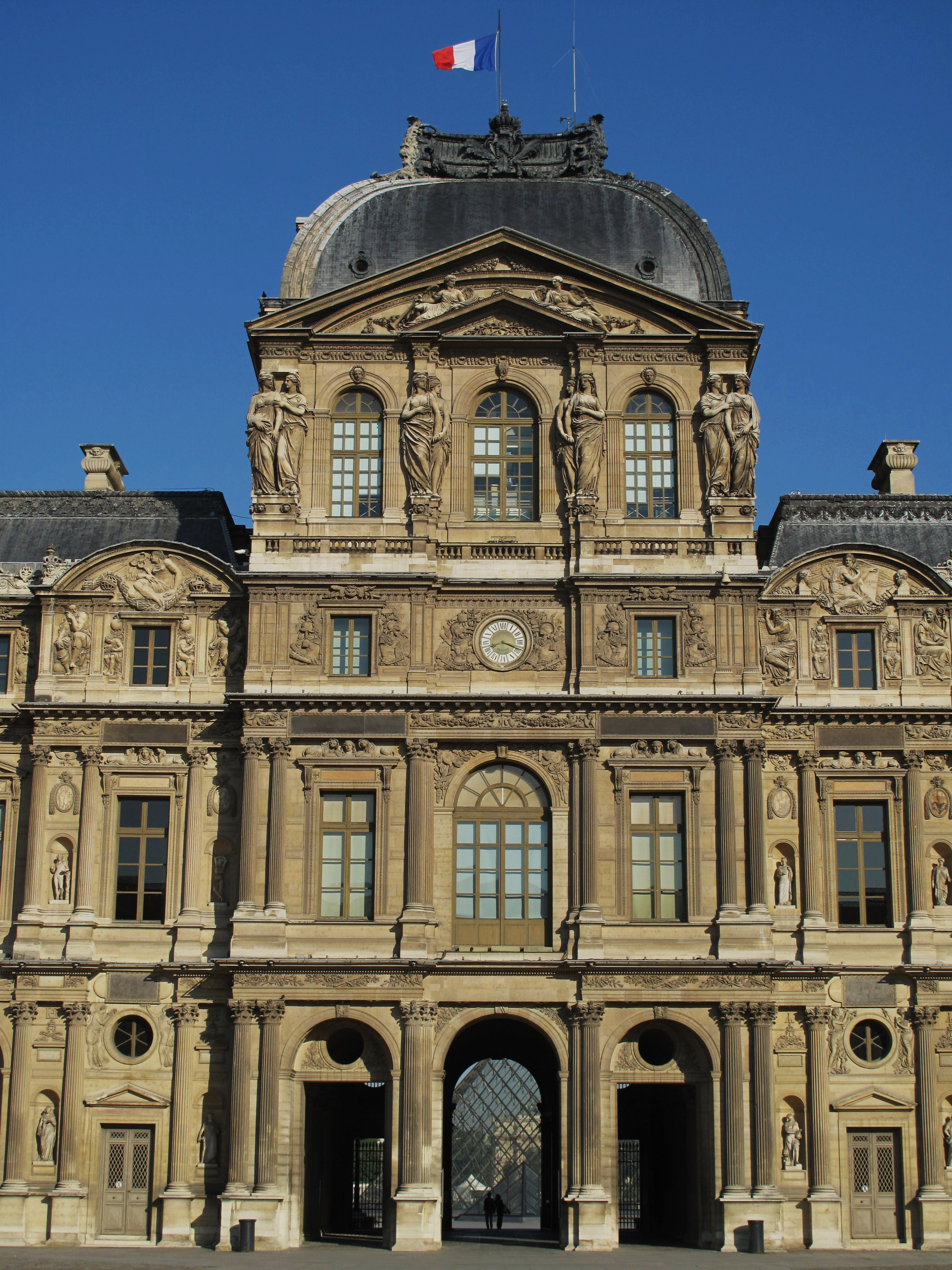
The Pavillon de l'Horloge of the Louvre Palace (1624–39), by Jacques Lemercier

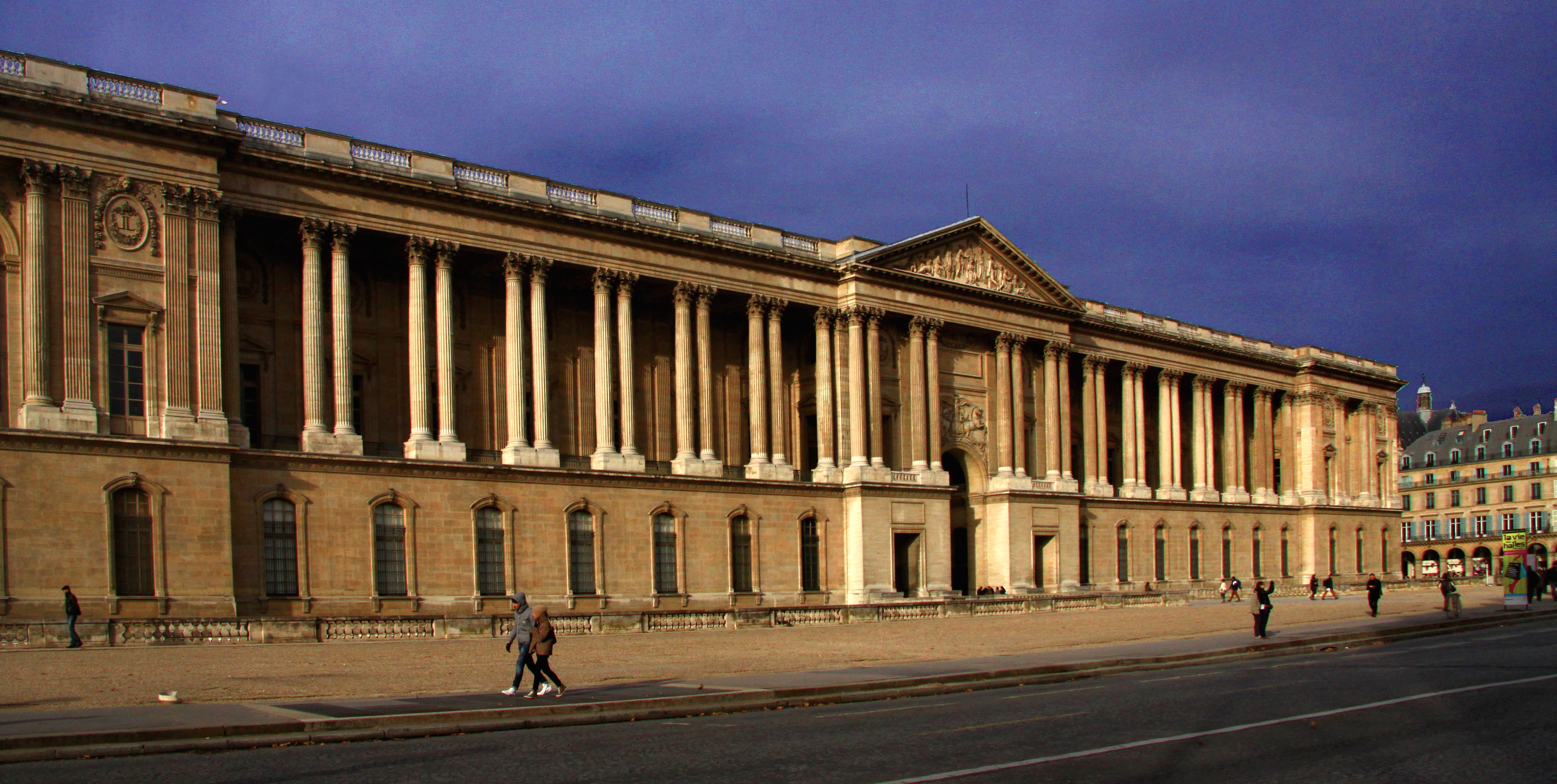
The colonnade on the east façade of the Louvre (1667–68), by Louis Le Vau, Charles Le Brun, François d'Orbay and Claude Perrault, was in the grand classical style of Louis XIV, symbolizing power and grandeur

After the assassination of Henry IV in 1610, his widow, Marie de' Medici, became the regent for the young Louis XIII and between 1615 and 1631 she built a residence for herself, the Luxembourg Palace, on the left bank. It was inspired by the palaces of her native Florence, but also by the innovations of the French Renaissance. The architect was Salomon de Brosse, followed by Marin de la Vallée and Jacques Lemercier. In the gardens, she built a magnificent fountain, the Medici Fountain, also on the Italian model.

The construction of the Louvre was one of the major Paris architectural projects of the 17th century, and the palace architecture clearly showed the transition from the French Renaissance to the classical style of Louis XIV. Jacques Lemercier had built the Pavillon de l'Orloge in 1624–39 in an ornate baroque style. Between 1667 and 1678 Louis Le Vau, Charles Le Brun, François d'Orbay and Claude Perrault rebuilt the east exterior façade of the courtyard with a long colonnade. A competition was held in 1670 for the south façade, which included a proposal from the Italian architect Bernini. Louis XIV rejected Bernini's Italianate plan in favor of a classical design by Perrault, which had a flat roof concealed by a balustrade and a series of massive columns and triangular pediments designed to convey elegance and power. Louis Le Vau and Claude Perrault rebuilt the interior façade of the cour Carée of the Louvre in a more classical version than that of the facing Renaissance façade. The Louvre was gradually transformed from a Renaissance and baroque palace to the classical grand style of Louis XIV.

=== Religious architecture ===
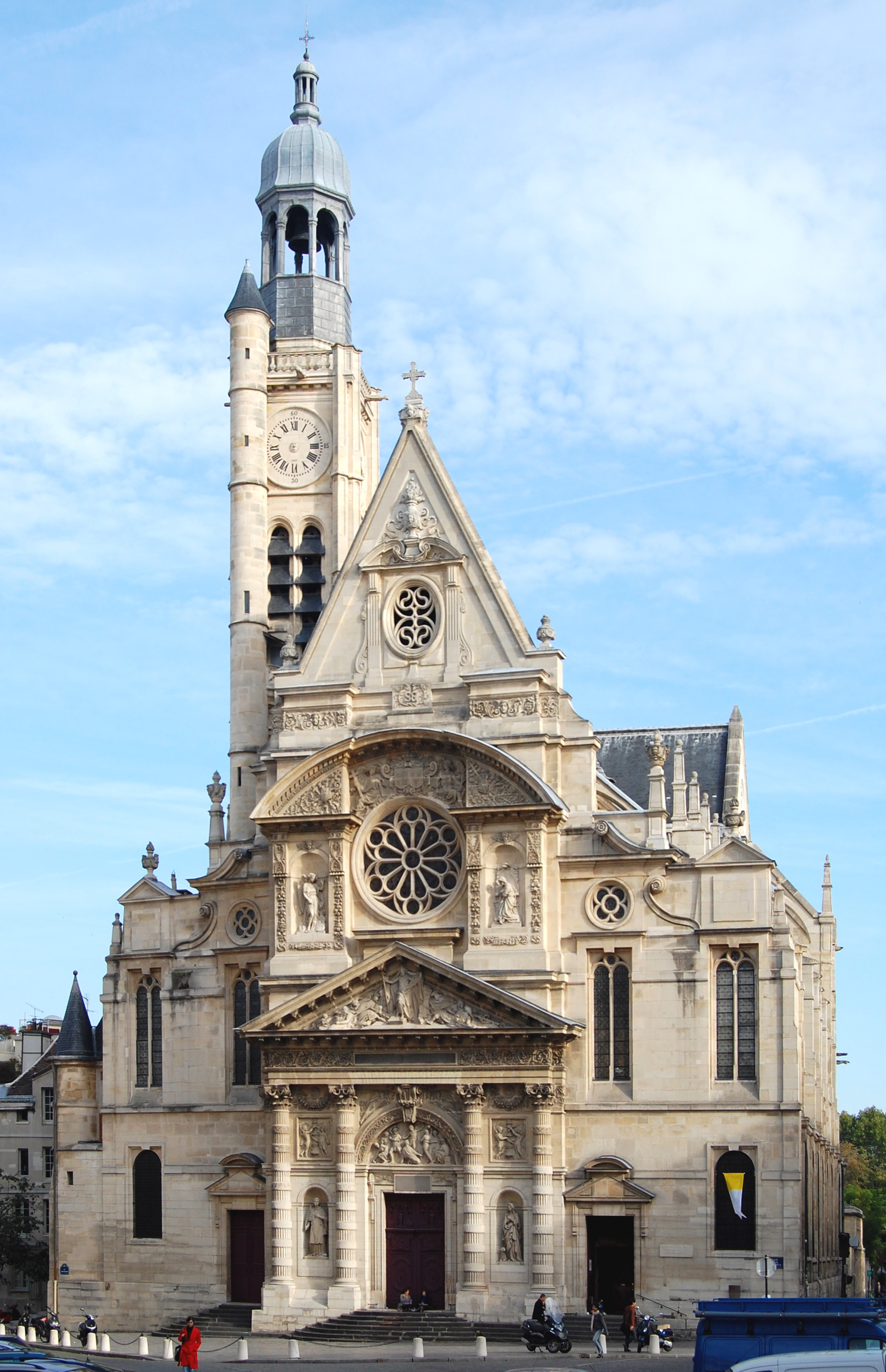
The church of Saint-Étienne-du-Mont by Claude Guérin, in the late Mannerist Gothic style (1606–21)

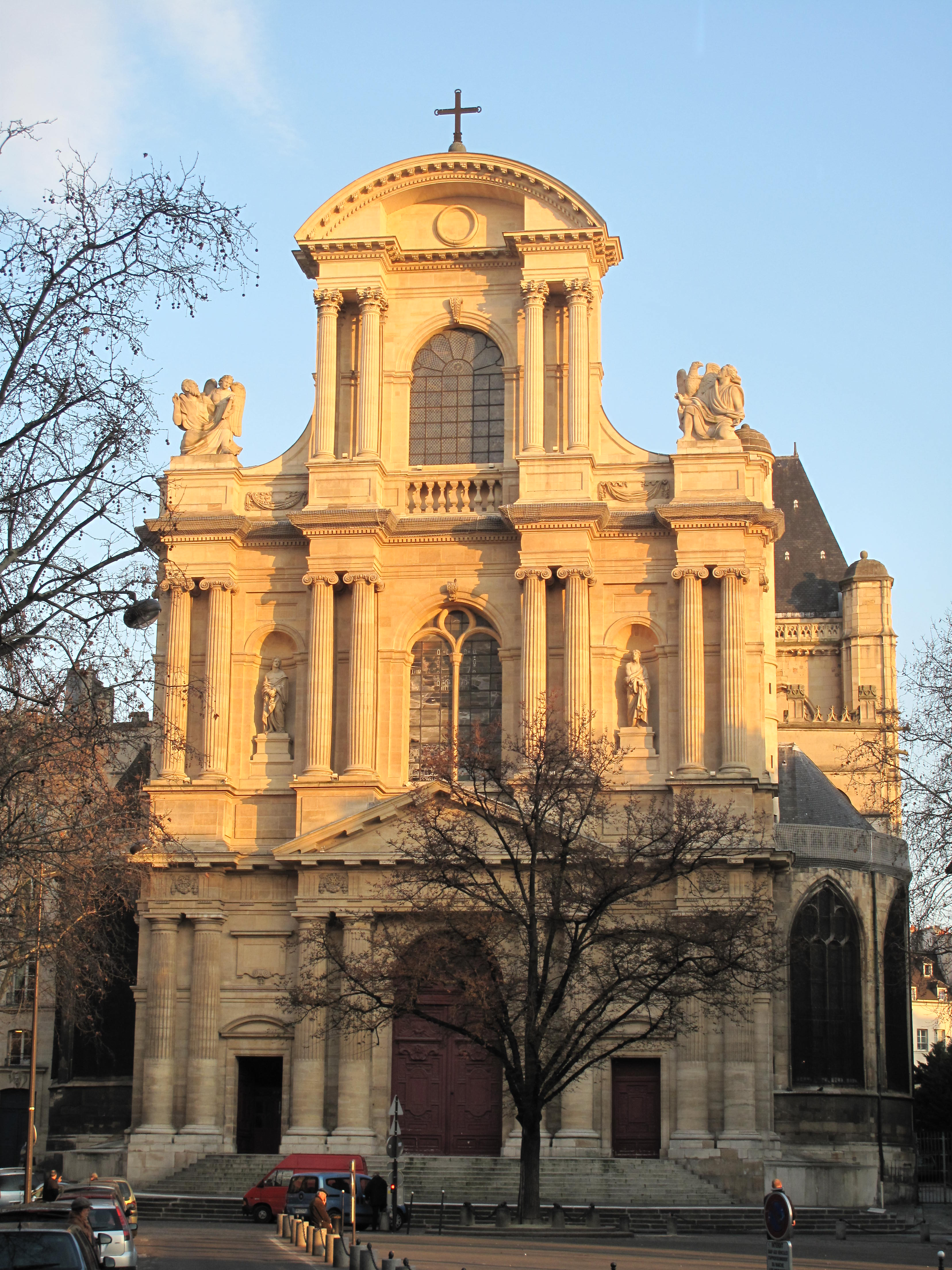
The Church of St-Gervais-et-St-Protais, the first Paris church with a façade in the new Baroque style (1616–20)

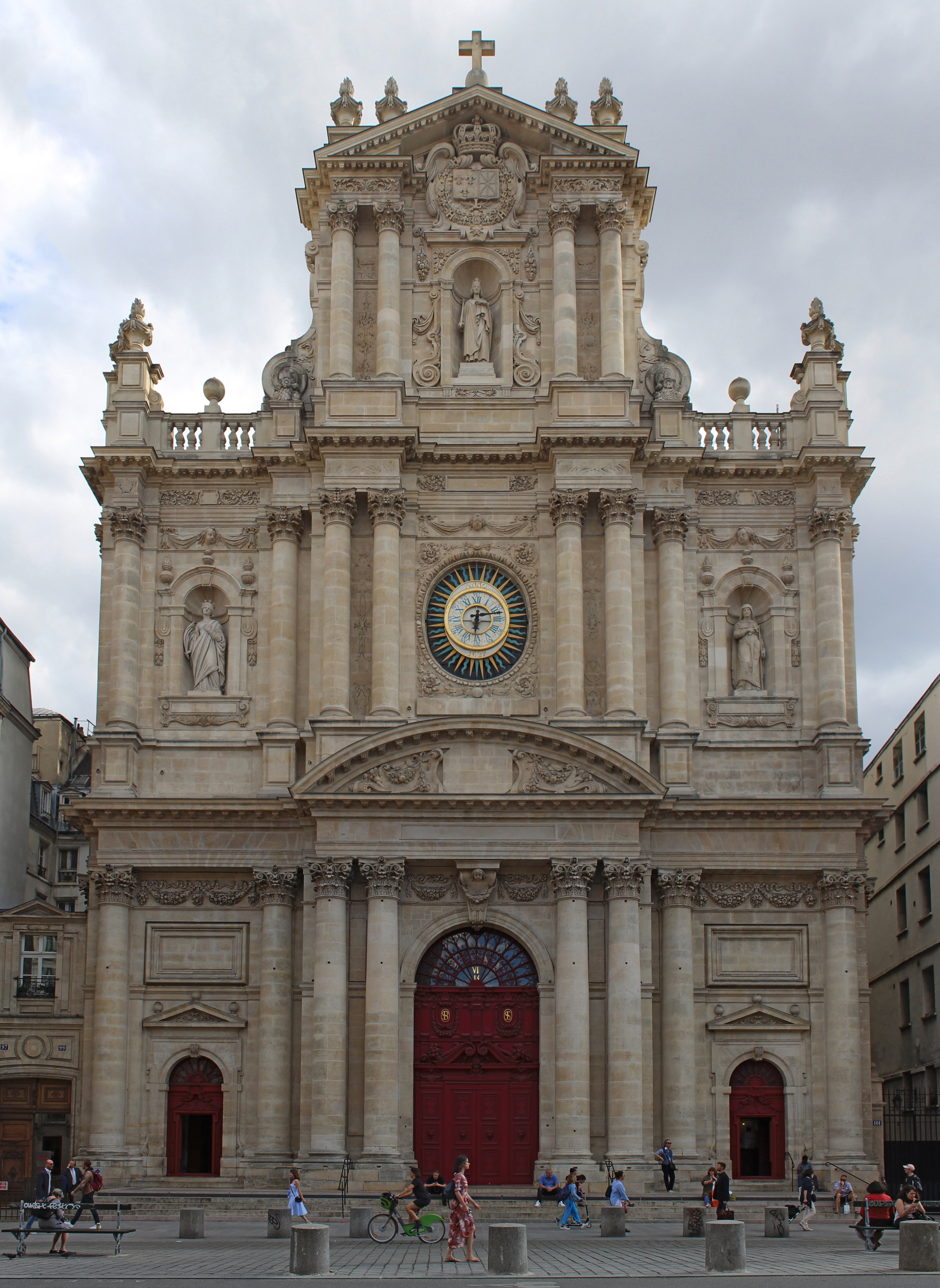
The Church of Saint-Paul-Saint-Louis (1627–41) by Étienne Martellange and François Derand

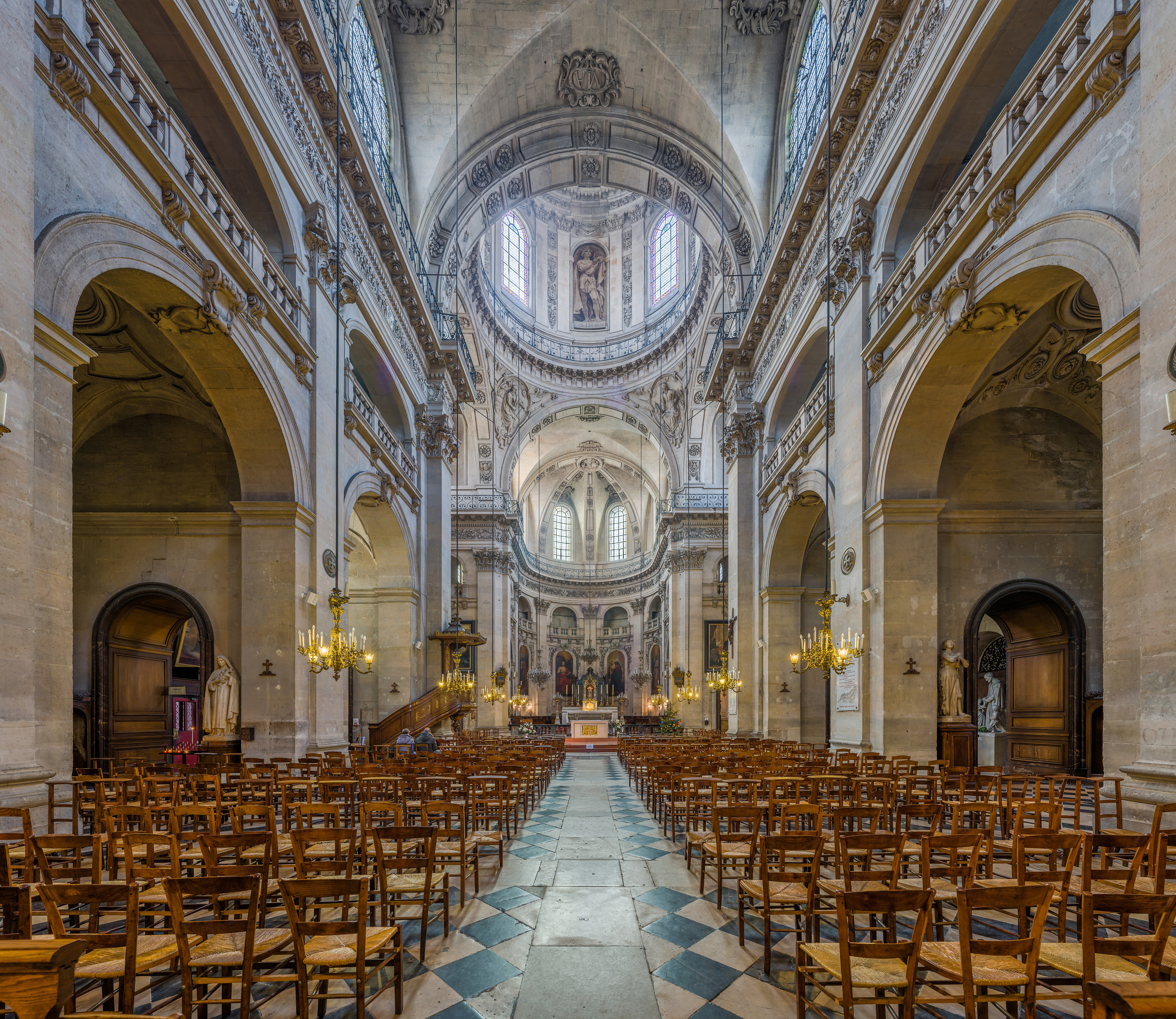
Interior of Saint-Paul-Saint-Louis (1627–41)

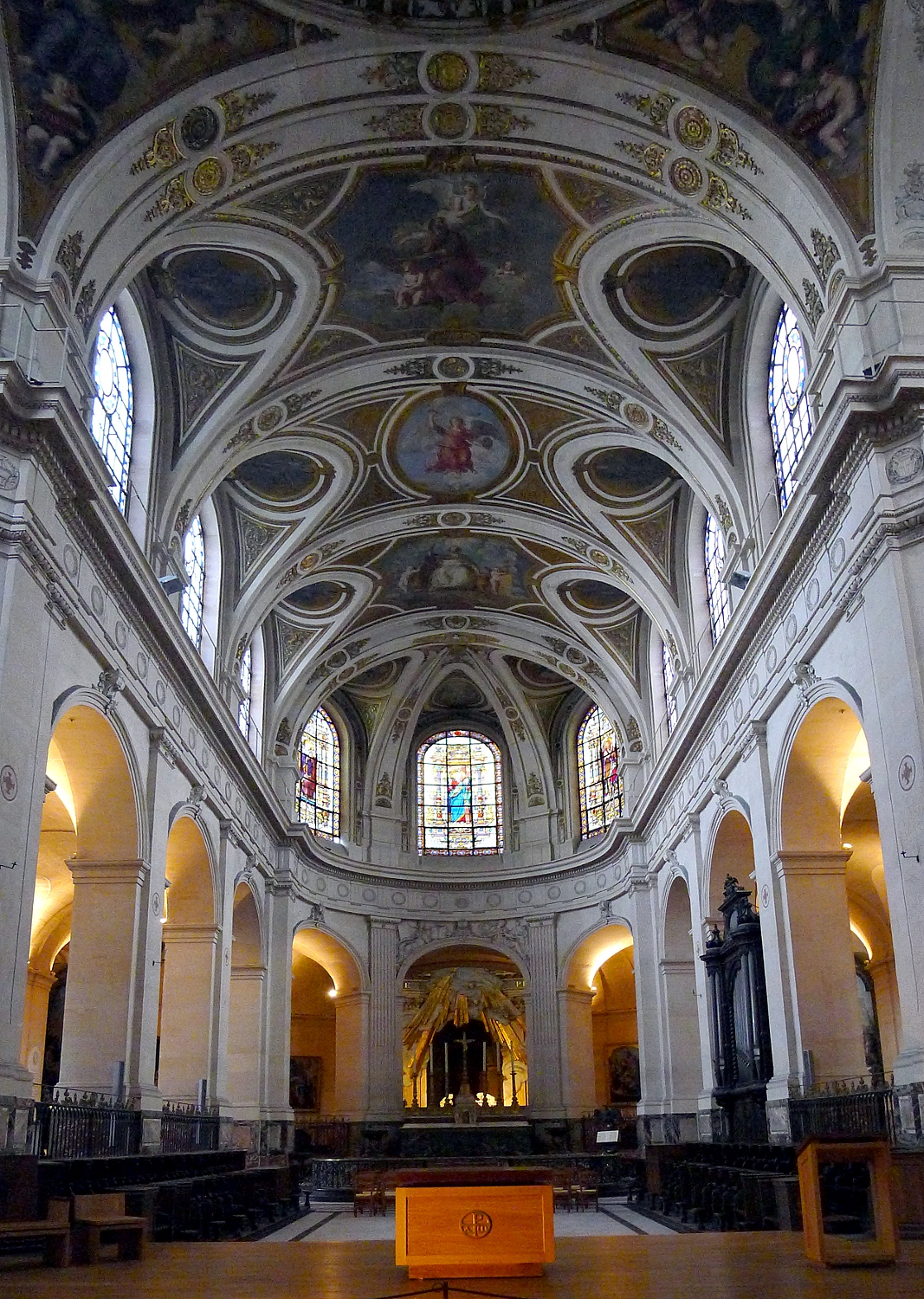
Church of Saint-Roch (1653–90) by Jacques Lemercier

Church architecture in the 17th century was slow to change. Interiors of new parish churches, such as Saint-Sulpice, Saint-Louis-en-l'Île and Saint-Roch largely followed the traditional Gothic floor-plan of Notre-Dame, though they did add façades and certain other decorative features from the Italian Baroque, and follow the advice of the Council of Trent to integrate themselves into the city's architecture, and they were aligned with the street. In 1675, an official survey on the state of church architecture in Paris made by architects Daniel Gittard and Libéral Bruant recommended that certain churches "so-called Gothic, without any good order, beauty or harmony" should be rebuilt "in the new style of our beautiful modern architecture", meaning the style imported from Italy, with certain French adaptations.

The architect Salomon de Brosse (1571–1626) introduced a new style of façade, based on the traditional orders of architecture (Doric, Ionic and Corinthian), placed one above the other. He first used this style in the façade of the Church of St-Gervais-et-St-Protais (1616–20). The style of the three superimposed orders appeared again in the Eglise Saint-Paul-Saint-Louis, the new Jesuit church in Paris, designed by the Jesuit architects Étienne Martellange and François Derand. Saint-Roch (1653–90), designed by Jacques Lemercier, had a Gothic plan but colorful Italian-style decoration.

=== Debut of the dome ===
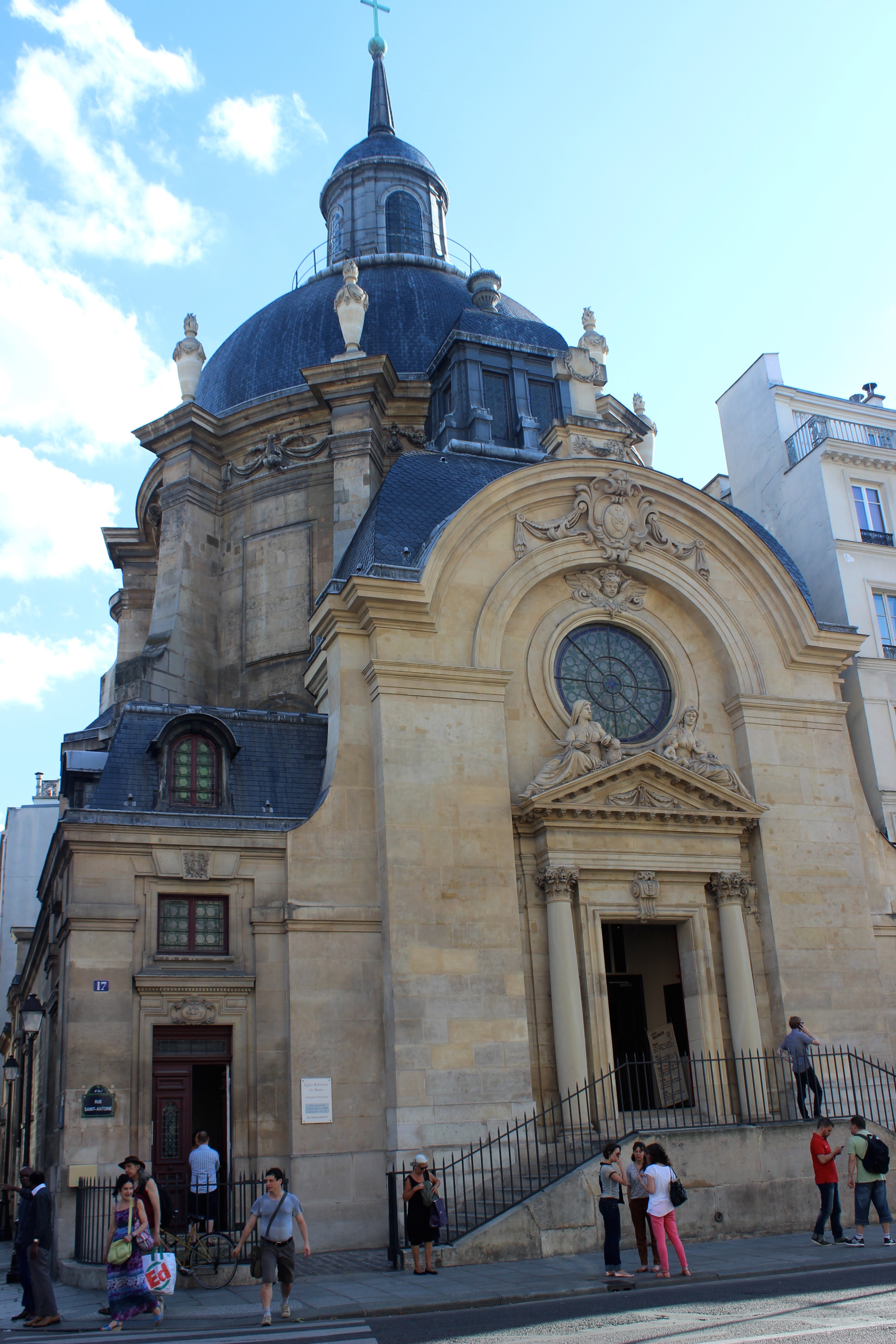
The former church of the Convent de la Visitation Sainte-Marie, now the Temple du Marais (1632–34) by François Mansart

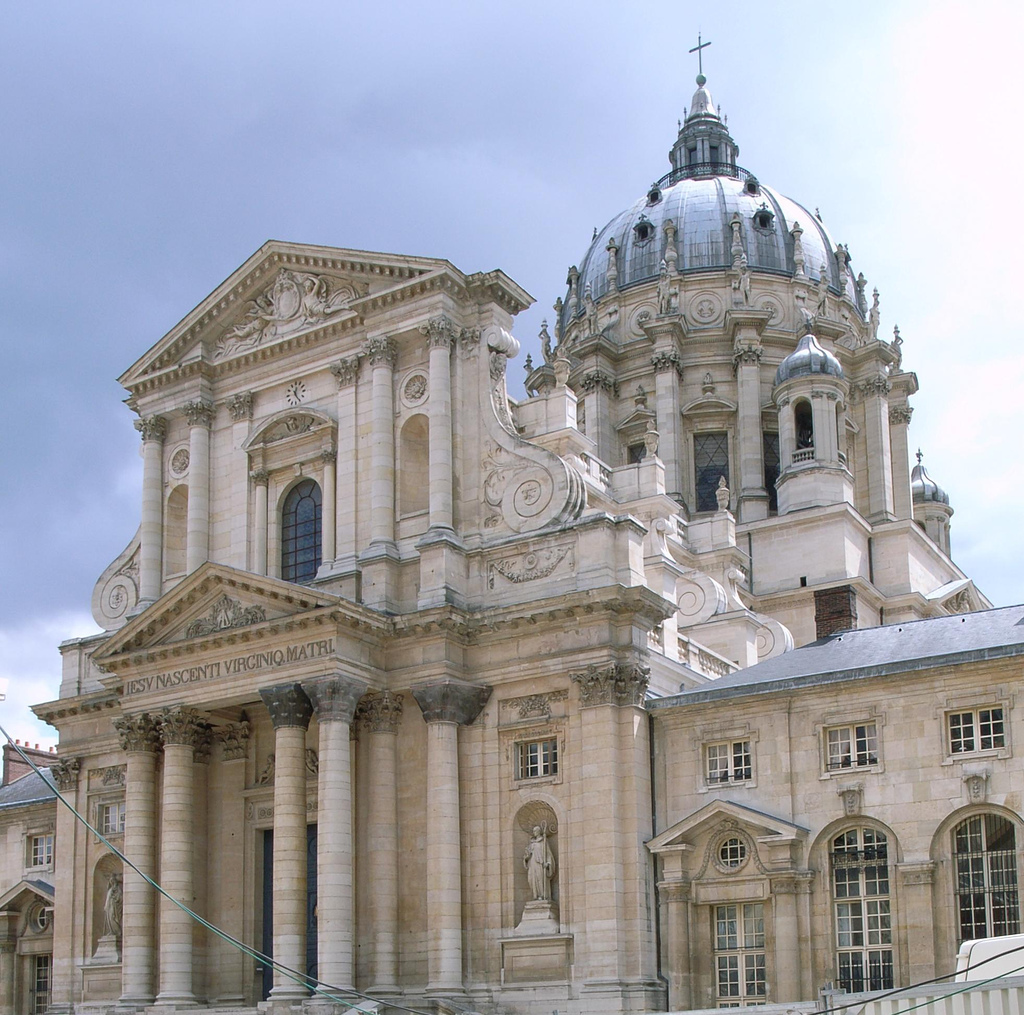
Church of the Abbey of Val-de-Grâce (1624–69) by François Mansart and Pierre Le Muet

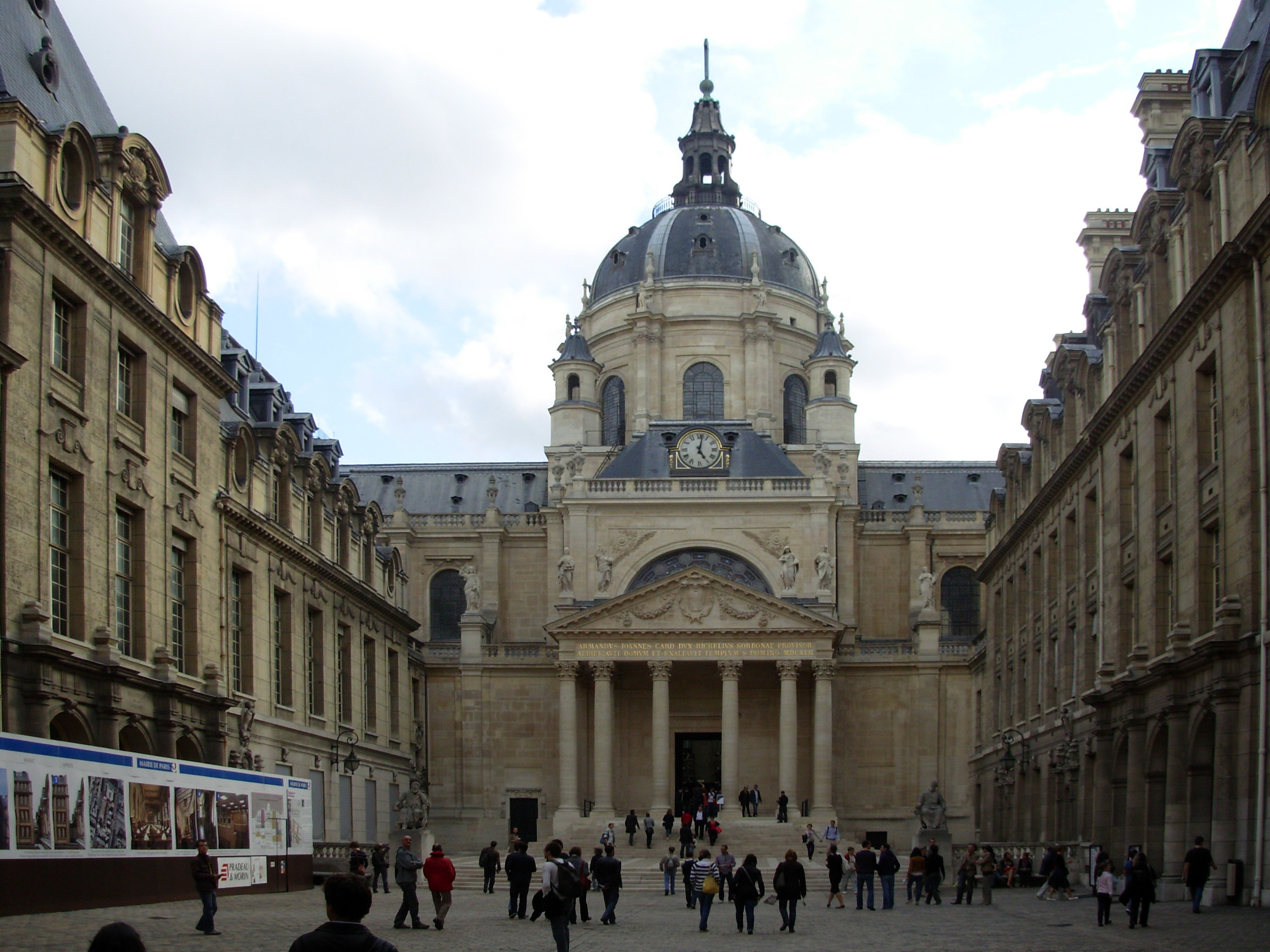
Chapel of the Sorbonne (1634–42) by Jacques Lemercier

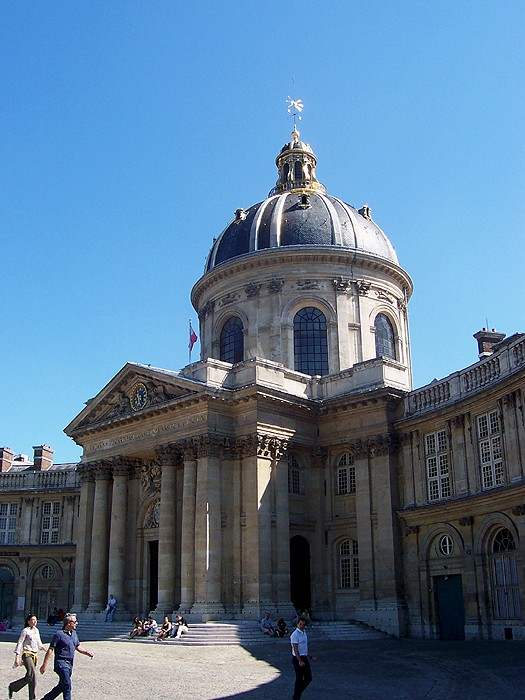
The Institut de France (1662–68) by Louis Le Vau and François d'Orbay

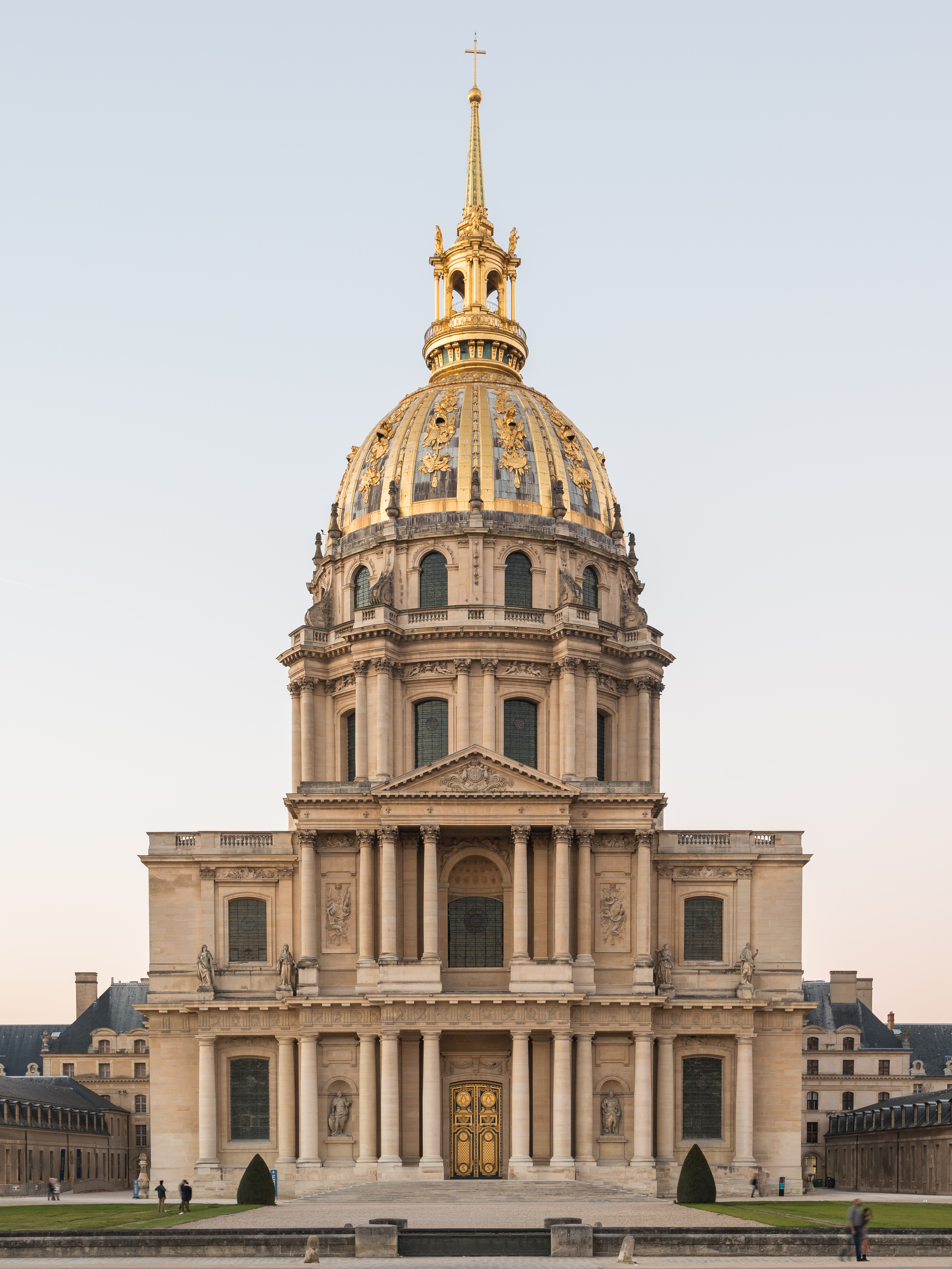
The Church of Les Invalides (1679–91), by Jules Hardouin-Mansart

The most dramatic new feature of Paris religious architecture in the 17th century was the dome, which was first imported from Italy in about 1630, and began to change the Paris skyline, which hitherto had been entirely dominated by church spires and bell towers. The domed churches began as a weapon of the Counter-Reformation against the architectural austerity of the Protestants. The prototype for the Paris domes was the Church of the Jesu, the Jesuit church in Rome, built in 1568–84 by Giacomo della Porta. A very modest dome was created in Paris between 1608 and 1619 in the chapel of the Louanges on rue Bonaparte. (Today it is part of the structure of the École des Beaux-Arts). The first large dome was on the church of Saint-Joseph des Carmes, which was finished in 1630. Modifications in the traditional religious services, strongly supported by the growing monastic orders in Paris, led to modification in church architecture, with more emphasis on the section in the center of the church, beneath the dome. The circle of clear glass windows of the lower part of the dome filled the church center with light.

The most eloquent early architect of domes was the architect François Mansart. His first dome was at the chapel of the Minimes (later destroyed), then at the chapel of the Church of the Convent of the Visitation Saint-Marie at 17 rue Saint-Antoine (4th arr.), built between 1632 and 1634. Now the Temple du Marais, it is the oldest surviving dome in the city. Another appeared on the Eglise-Saint-Joseph in the convent of the Carmes-dechaussés at 70 rue de Vaugirard (6th arr.) between 1628 and 1630. Another dome soon was built in the Marais; the dome of the Church of Saint-Paul-Saint-Louis at 899-101 rue Saint-Antoine (1627–41), by Étienne Martellange and François Derand. It was followed by church of the Abbey of Val-de-Grâce (5th arr.) (1624–69), by Mansart and Pierre Le Muet; then by a dome on the Chapel of Saint-Ursule at the college of the Sorbonne (1632–34), by Jacques Lemercier; and the college des Quatres-Nations (now the Institute of France (1662–68), by Louis LeVau and François d'Orbay; and the church of Notre-Dame de l'Assomption de Paris on rue Saint-Honoré (1st arr.) (1670–76) by Charles Errard. The most majestic dome was that of the chapel of Les Invalides, by Jules Hardouin-Mansart, built between 1677 and 1706. The last dome of the period was for a Protestant church, the Temple de Pentemont on rue de Grenelle (7th arr.) (about 1700) by Charles de La Fosse.

=== Residential architecture – the rustic style ===
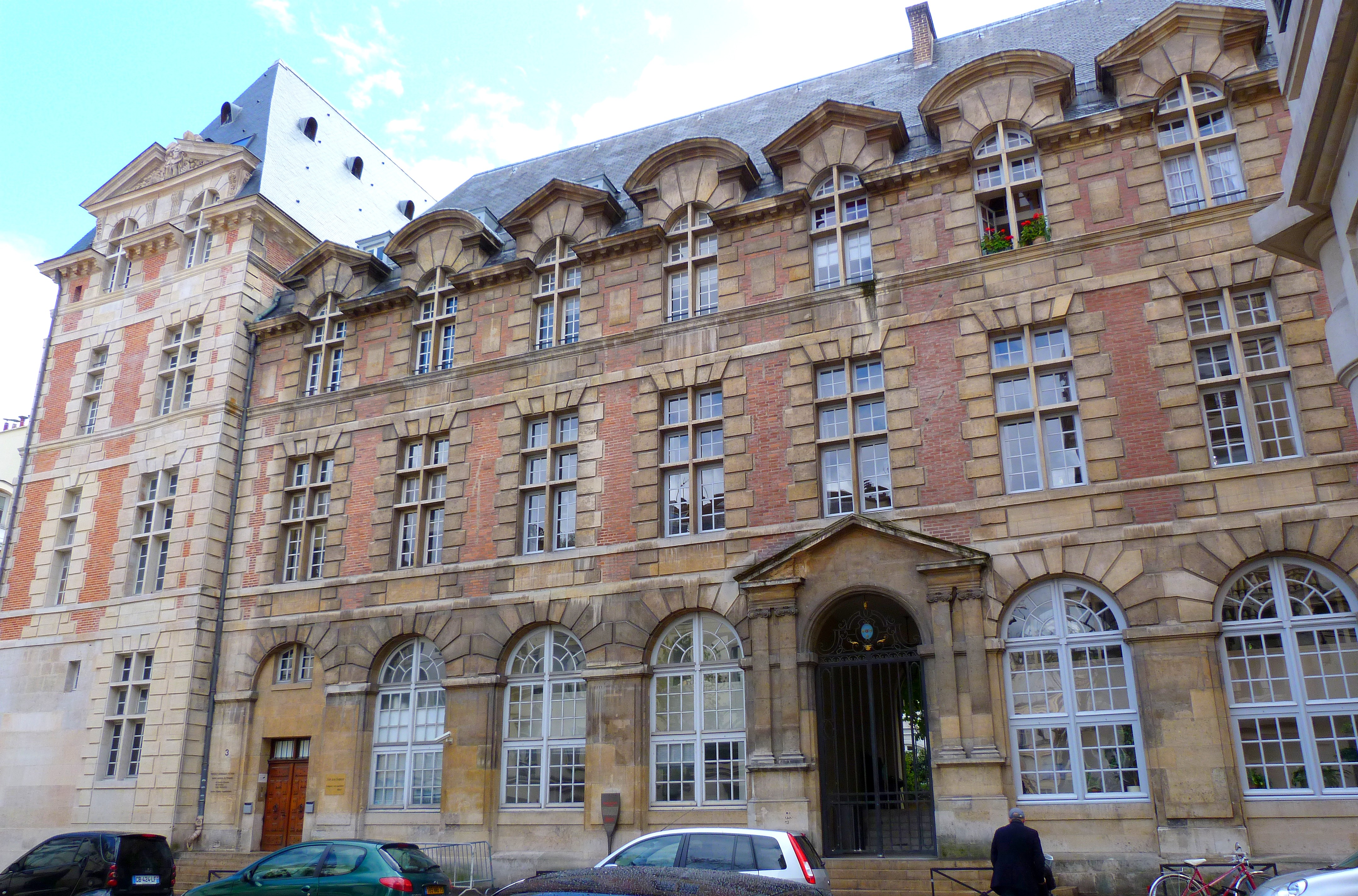
The residence of the Abbot of the Abbey of Saint-Germain-des-Prés (1586)

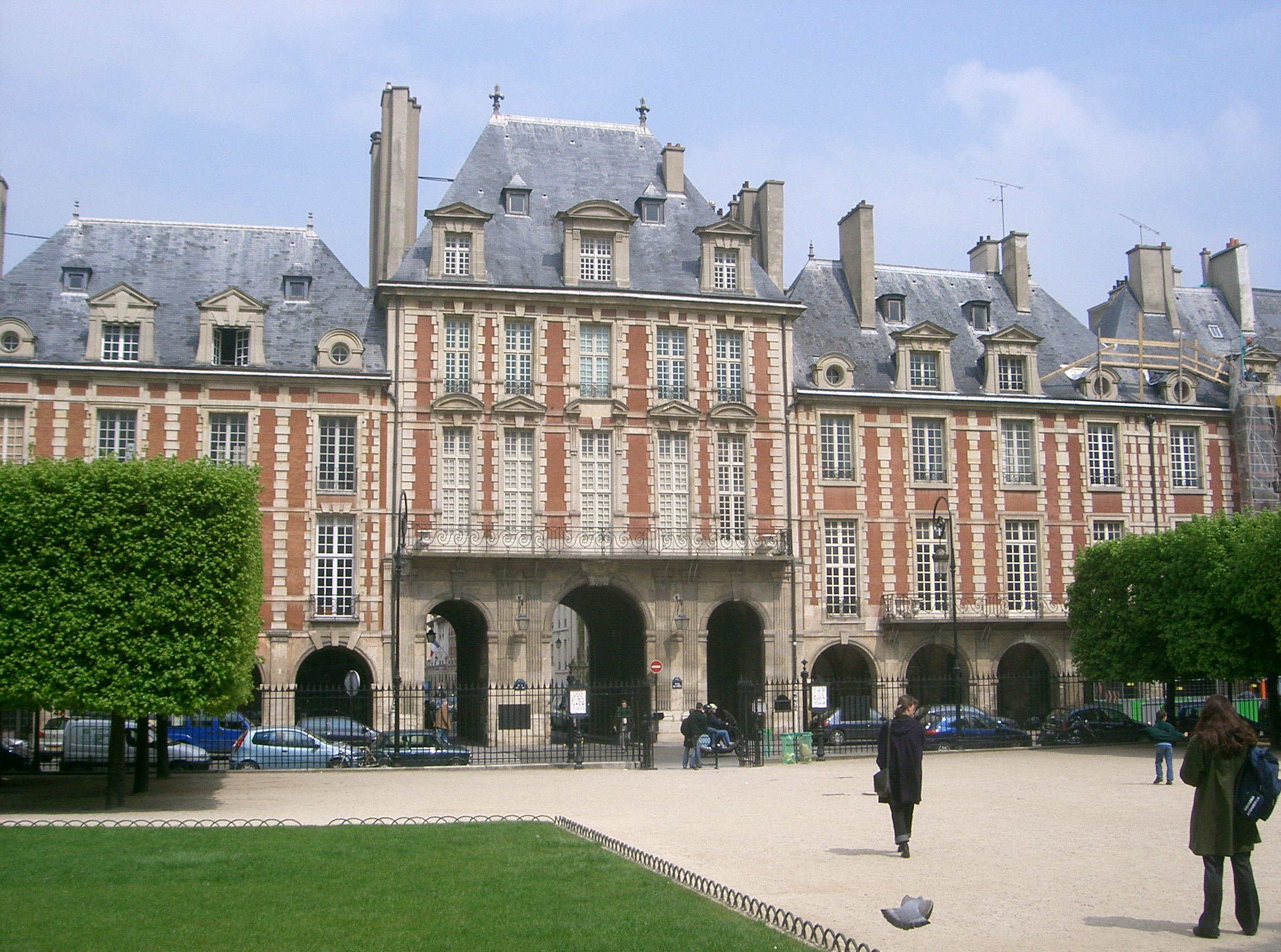
The Pavillon de a Reine of Place des Vosges (1605–12)

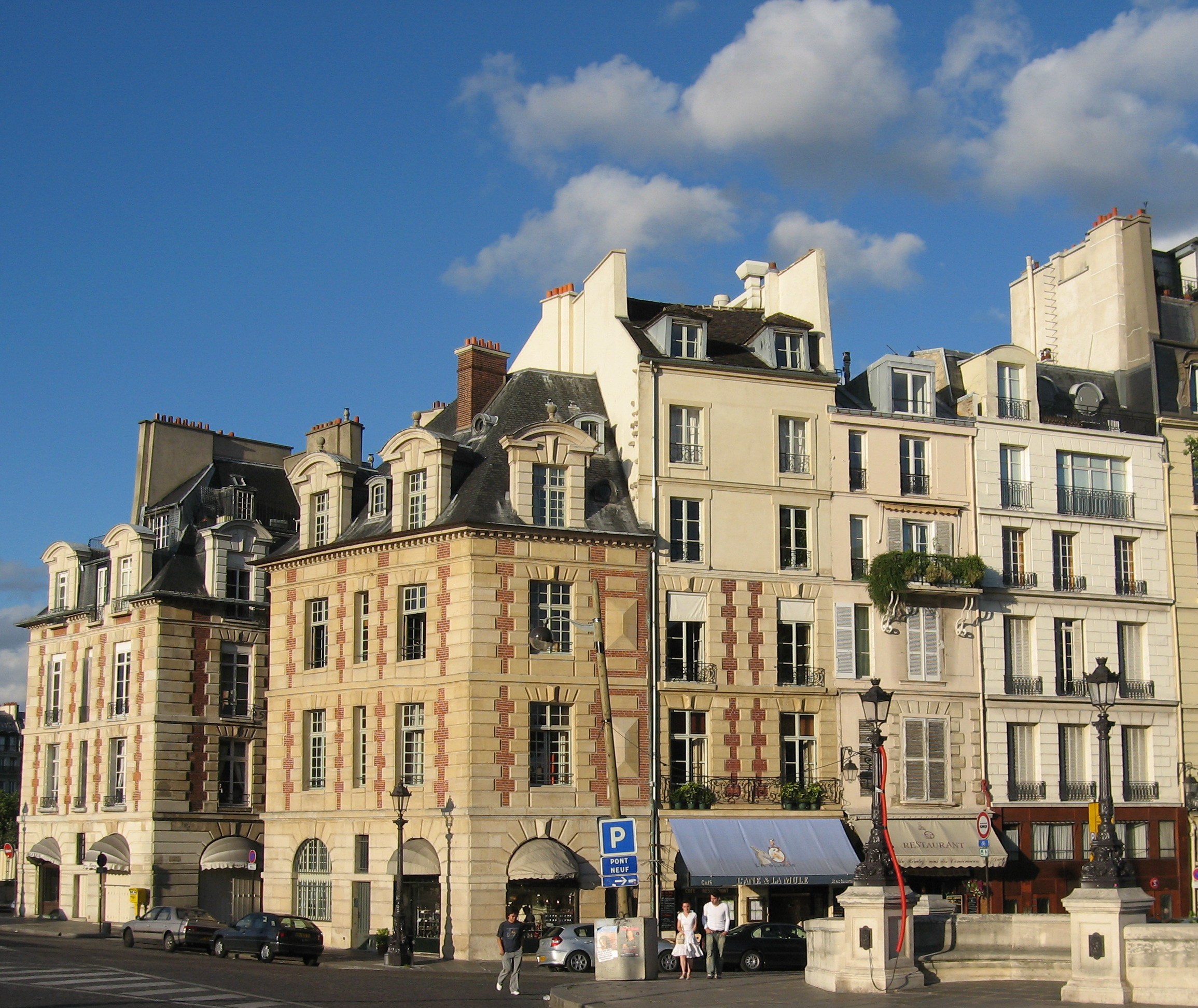
The two remaining original houses of Place Dauphine (1607–10)

An elegant new form of domestic architecture, the rustic style, appeared in Paris in the wealthy Le Marais at the end of the 16th and beginning of the 17th century. This style of architecture was usually used for ornate apartments in wealthy areas and for hôtels particuliers. It was sometimes called the "style of three crayons" because it used three colors; black slate tiles, red brick, and white stone. This architecture was expensive, having a variety of different materials, and ornate stone work. This style inspired the unique Palais de Versailles. The earliest existing examples are the house known as the Maison de Jacques Cœur at 40 rue des Archives (4th arr.) from the late 16th century; the Hôtel Scipion Sardini at 13 rue Scipion in the (5th arr,) from 1532, and the Abbot's residence at the Abbey of Saint-Germain-des-Prés at 3-5 rue de l'Abbaye, (6th arr.), from 1586. The most famous examples around found around the Place des Vosges, built between 1605 and 1612. Other good examples are the Hospital of Saint-Louis on rue Buchat (10th arr.) from 1607 to 1611; the two houses at 1-6 Place Dauphine on the Île de la Cité, from 1607 to 1612; and the Hôtel d'Alméras at 30 rue des Francs-Bourgeois (4th arr.), from 1612.

=== Residences – the classical style ===
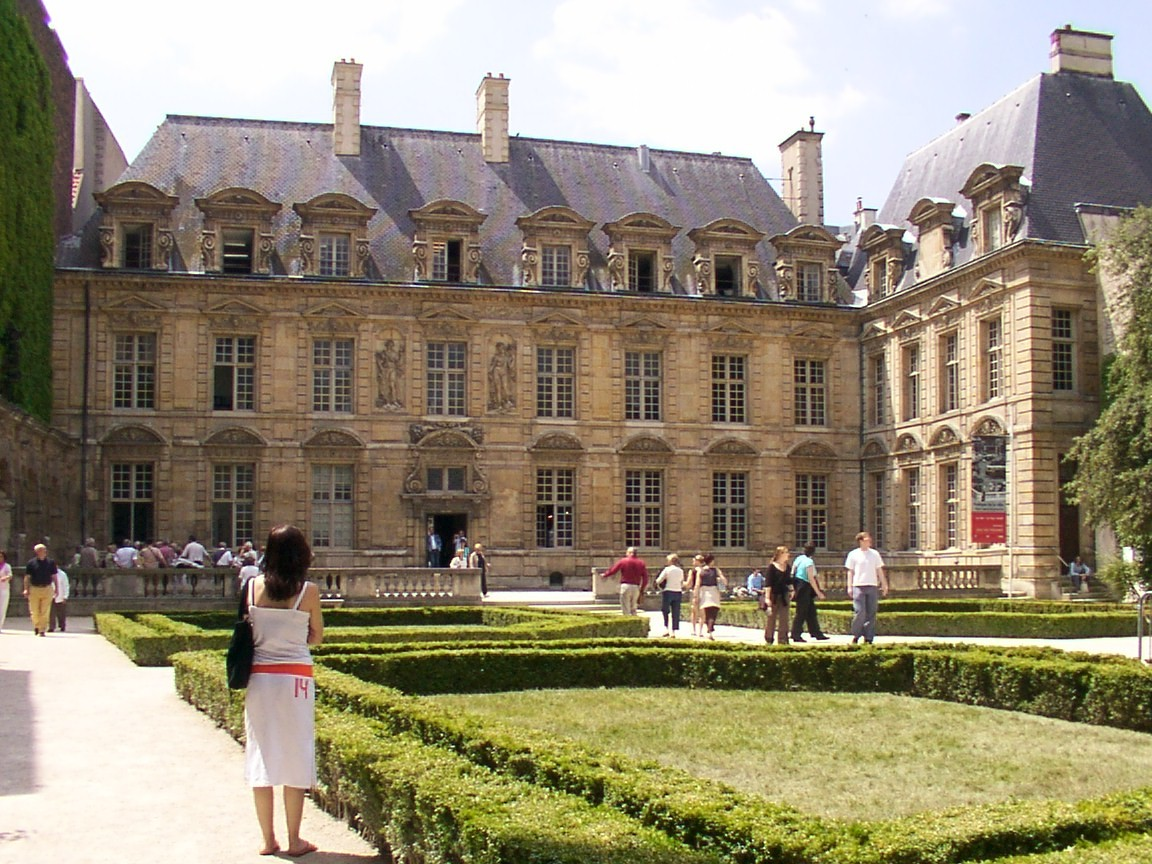
The Hotel de Sully at 62 rue Saint-Antoine (4th arr.) (1624–30) by Jean Androuet du Cerceau

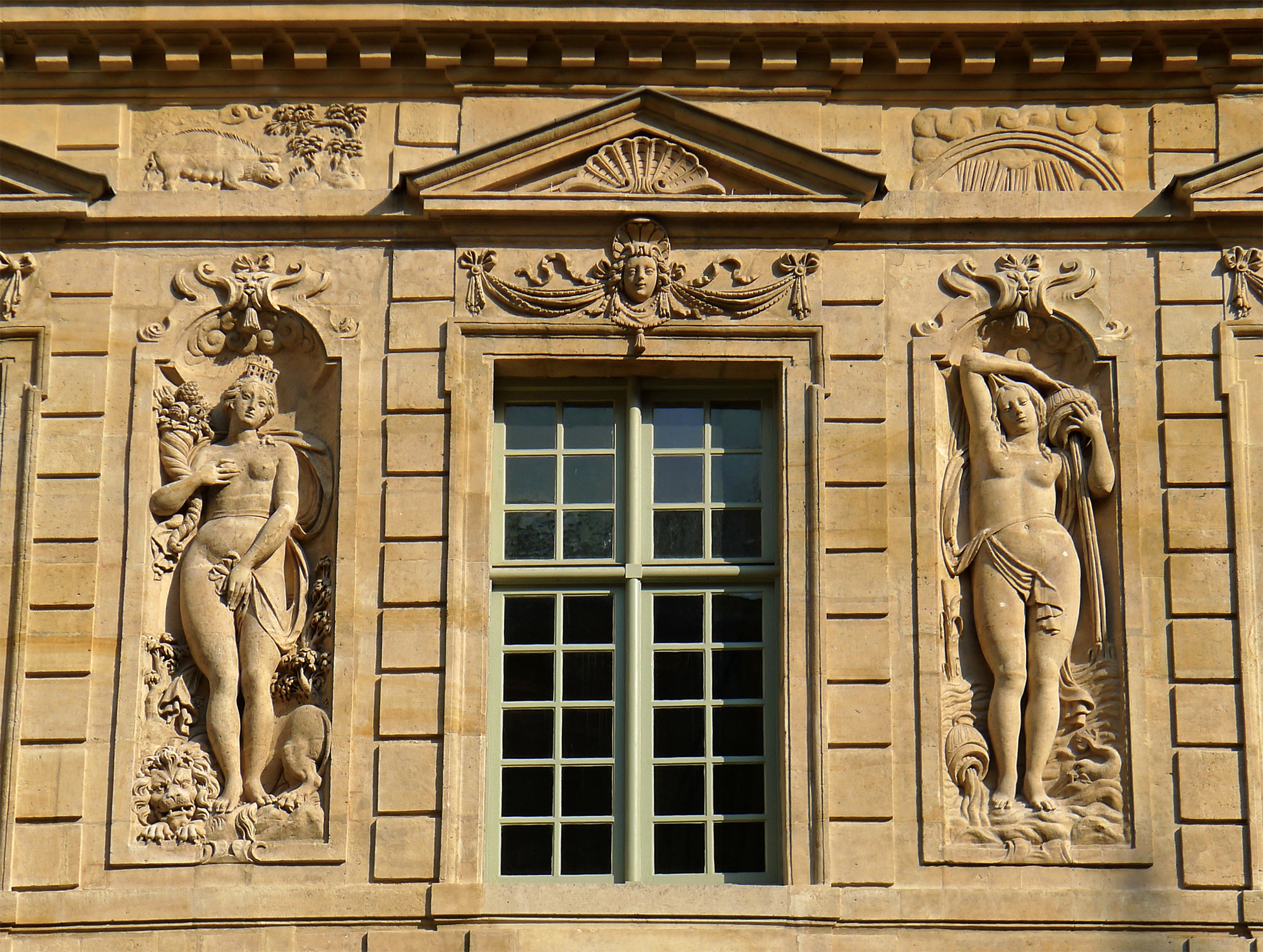
Detail of the decoration of the Hotel de Sully

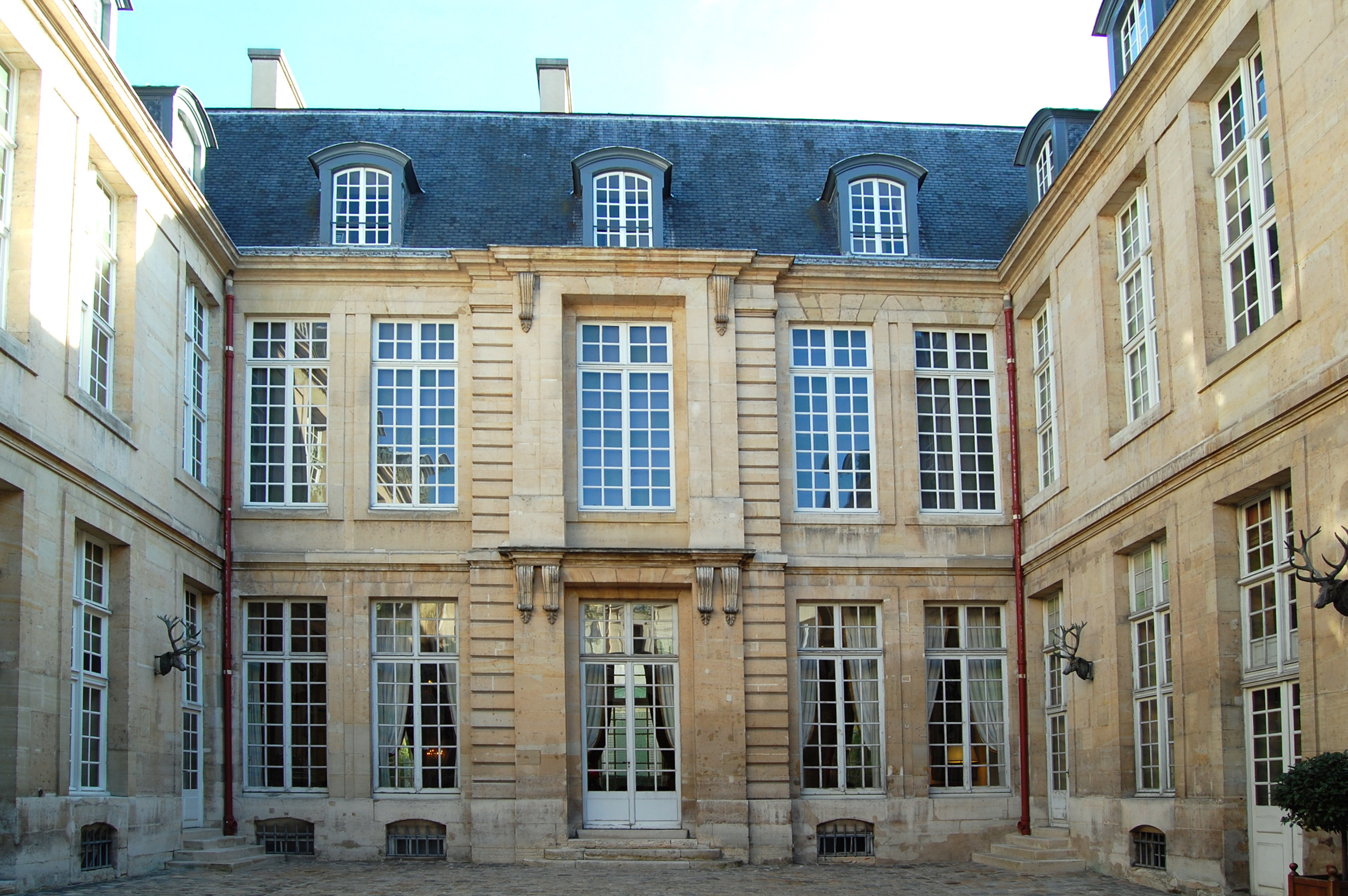
The Hotel de Guénégaud des Brosses (1653) by François Mansart introduced a sober new classical residential style

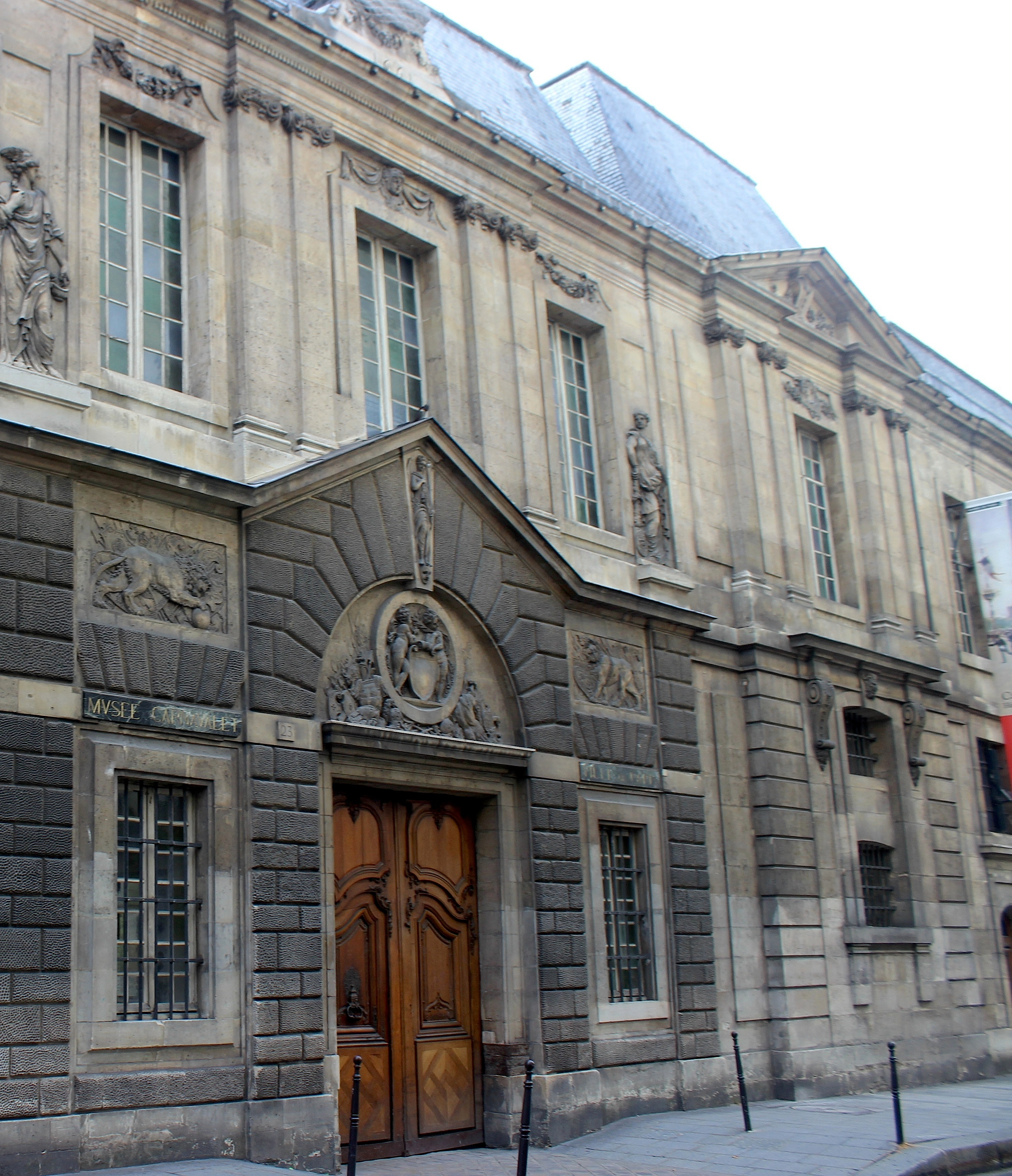
François Mansart kept the Renaissance portal of the Hôtel Carnavalet but built a classical façade above it (1661)

The palatial new residences built by the nobility and the wealthy in the Marais featured two new and original specialized rooms; the dining room and the salon. The new residences typically were separated from the street by a wall and gatehouse. There was a large court of honor inside the gates, with galleries on either side, used for receptions, and for services and the stables. The house itself opened both onto the courtyard and onto a separate garden. One good example in its original form, between the Place des Vosges and rue Saint-Antoine, is the Hôtel de Sully, (1624–29), built by Jean Androuet du Cerceau.

After 1650 the architect François Mansart introduced a more classical and sober style to the hôtel particulier. The Hôtel de Guénégaud des Brosses at 60 rue des Archives (3rd arrondissement) from 1653 had a greatly simplified and severe façade. Beginning in the 1660s Mansart remade the façades of the Hôtel Carnavalet, preserving some of the Renaissance decoration and a 16th portal but integrating them into a more classical composition, with columns, pediments and stone bossage.

== The 18th century – The triumph of neoclassicism ==
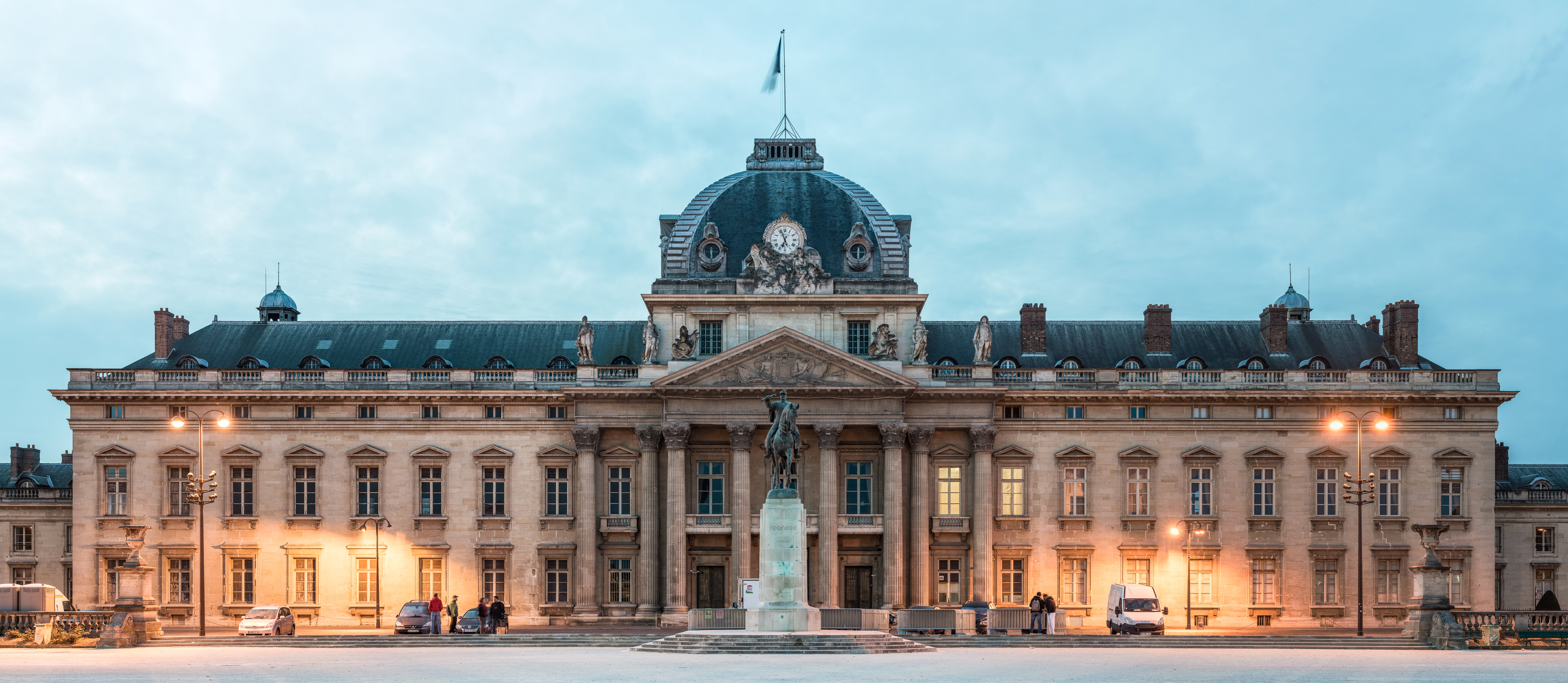
The École Militaire (1751–80) by Ange-Jacques Gabriel, combined French classicism with Italian decorative elements

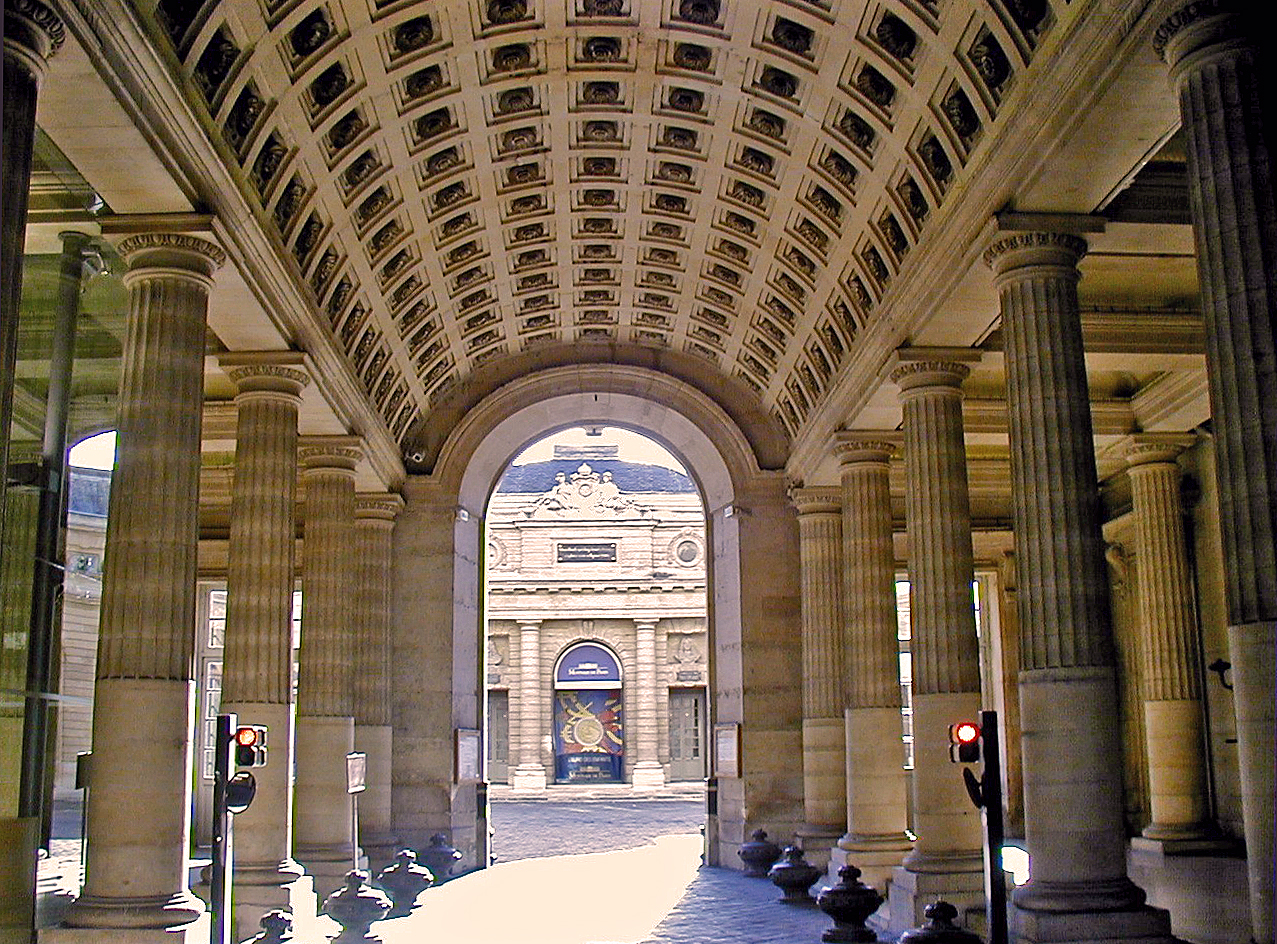
Entrance to the royal mint, the Hôtel des Monnaies, on quai de Conti (1767–73)

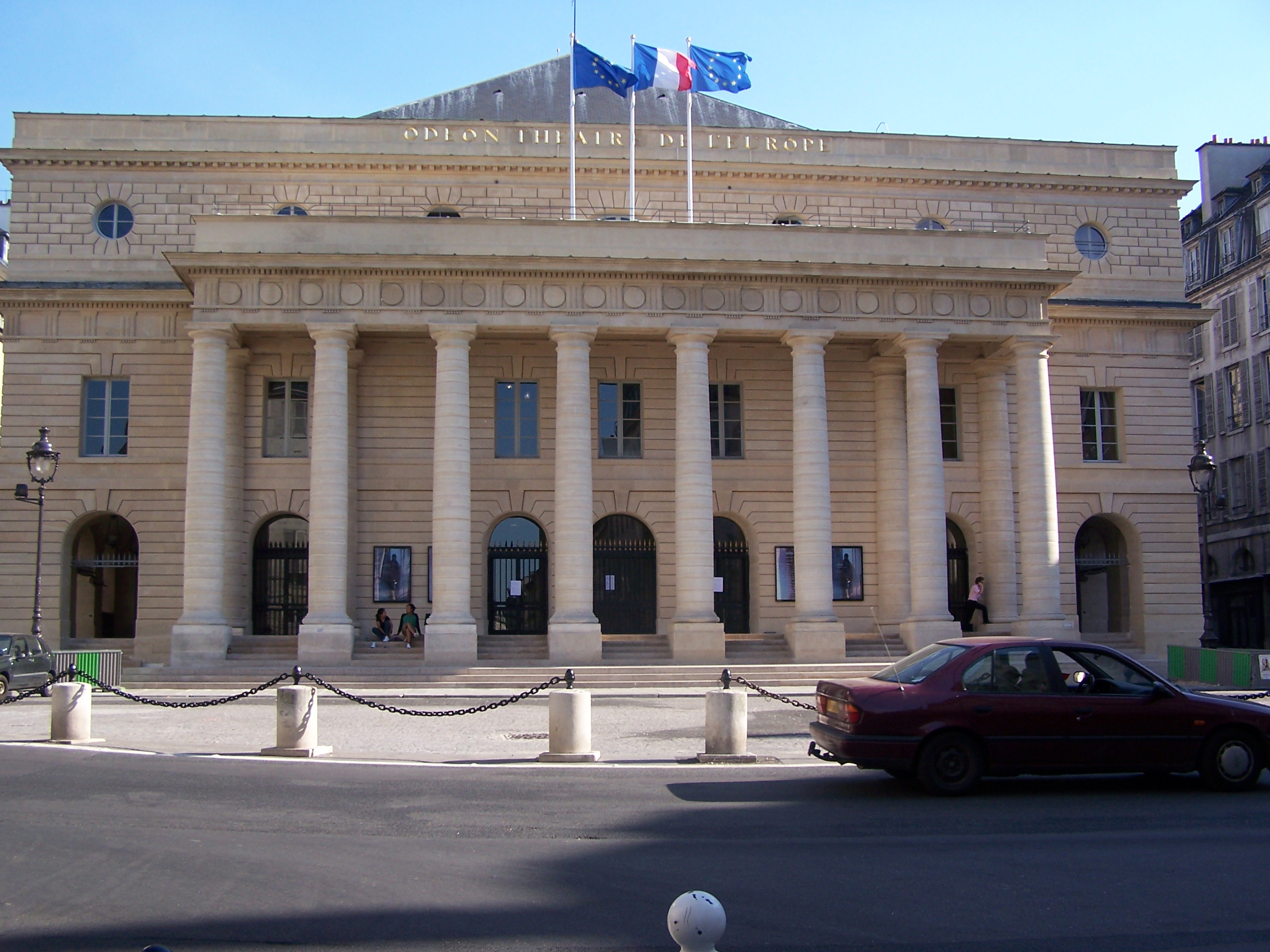
Théâtre de l'Europe on place de l'Odéon (6th arr.) (1767–83) by Marie-Joseph Peyre and Charles de Wailly, the centerpiece of a neoclassical 18th-century square

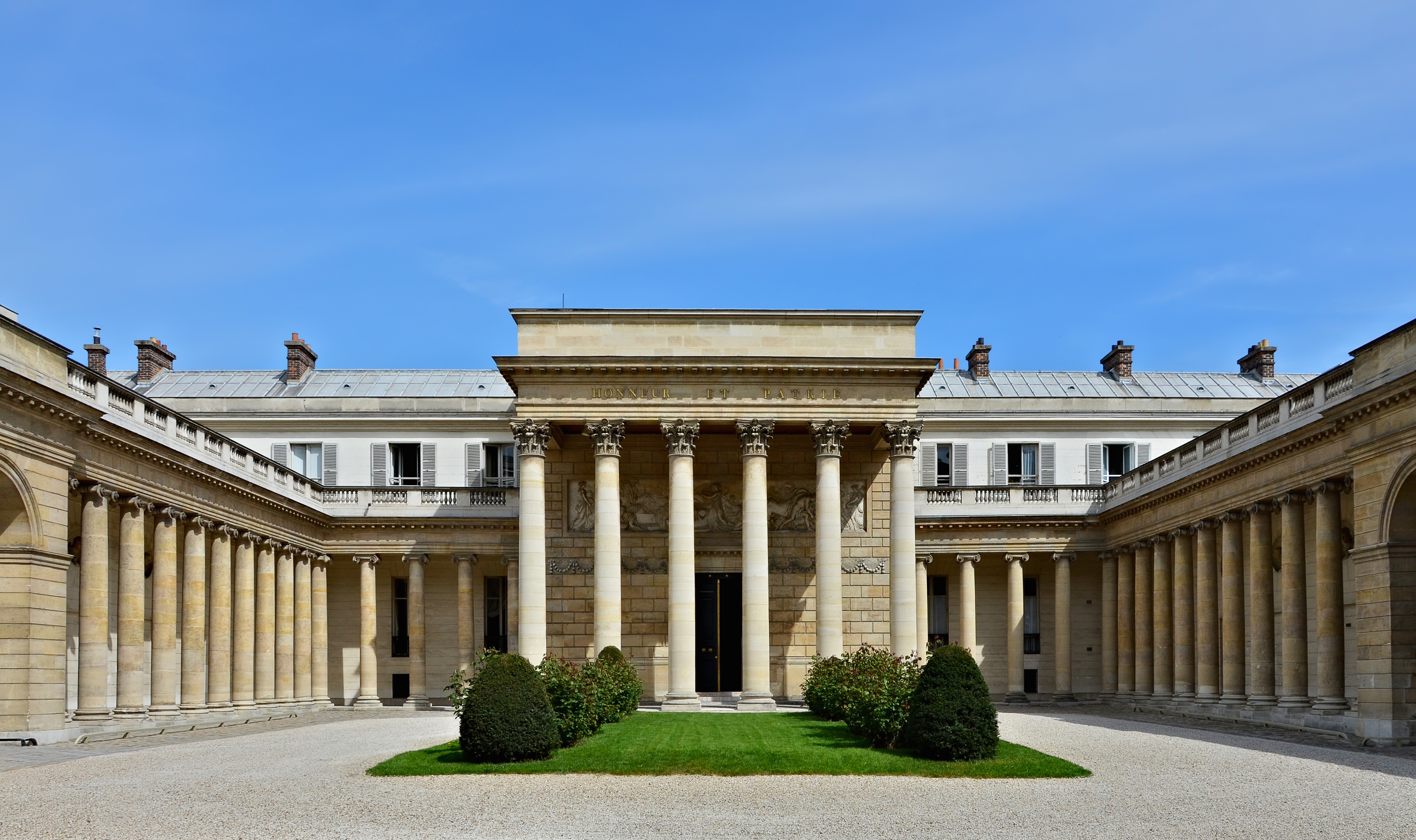
Courtyard of the Hôtel Salm, now the Palais de la Légion d'Honneur (1782–89), by Pierre Rousseau

During the first half of the 18th century, the grand style of Louis XIV, defined by the Royal Academy of Architecture and evoking power and grandeur, dominated Paris architecture. In 1722, Louis XV returned the court to Versailles, and visited the city only on special occasions. While he rarely came into Paris, he did make important additions to the city's landmarks. His first major building was the École Militaire, a new military school, on the Left Bank. It was built between 1739 and 1745 by Ange-Jacques Gabriel. Gabriel borrowed the design of the Pavillon d'Horloge of the Louvre by Lemercier for the central pavilion, a façade influenced by Mansart, and Italian touches from Palladio and Giovanni Battista Piranesi.

In the second part of the century, a more purely neoclassical style, based directly on Greek and Roman models, began to appear. It was strongly influenced by a visit to Rome in 1750 by the architect Jacques-Germain Soufflot and the future Marquis de Marigny, the director of buildings for King Louis XV. They and other architects who made the obligatory trip to Italy brought back classical ideas and drawings which defined Paris architecture until the 1830s.

Soufflot's Roman trip led to the design of the new church of Saint Genevieve, now the Panthéon, the model of the neoclassical style, constructed on the summit of Mont Geneviéve between 1764 and 1790. It was not completed until the French Revolution, at which time it became a mausoleum for Revolutionary heroes. Other royal commissions in the new style included the royal mint, the Hotel des Monnaies on the Quai de Conti (6th arr.), with a 117-meter-long façade along the Seine, dominated by its massive central Avant-corps and vestibule decorated with Doric columns and caisson ceilings (1767–75).

=== Religious architecture ===
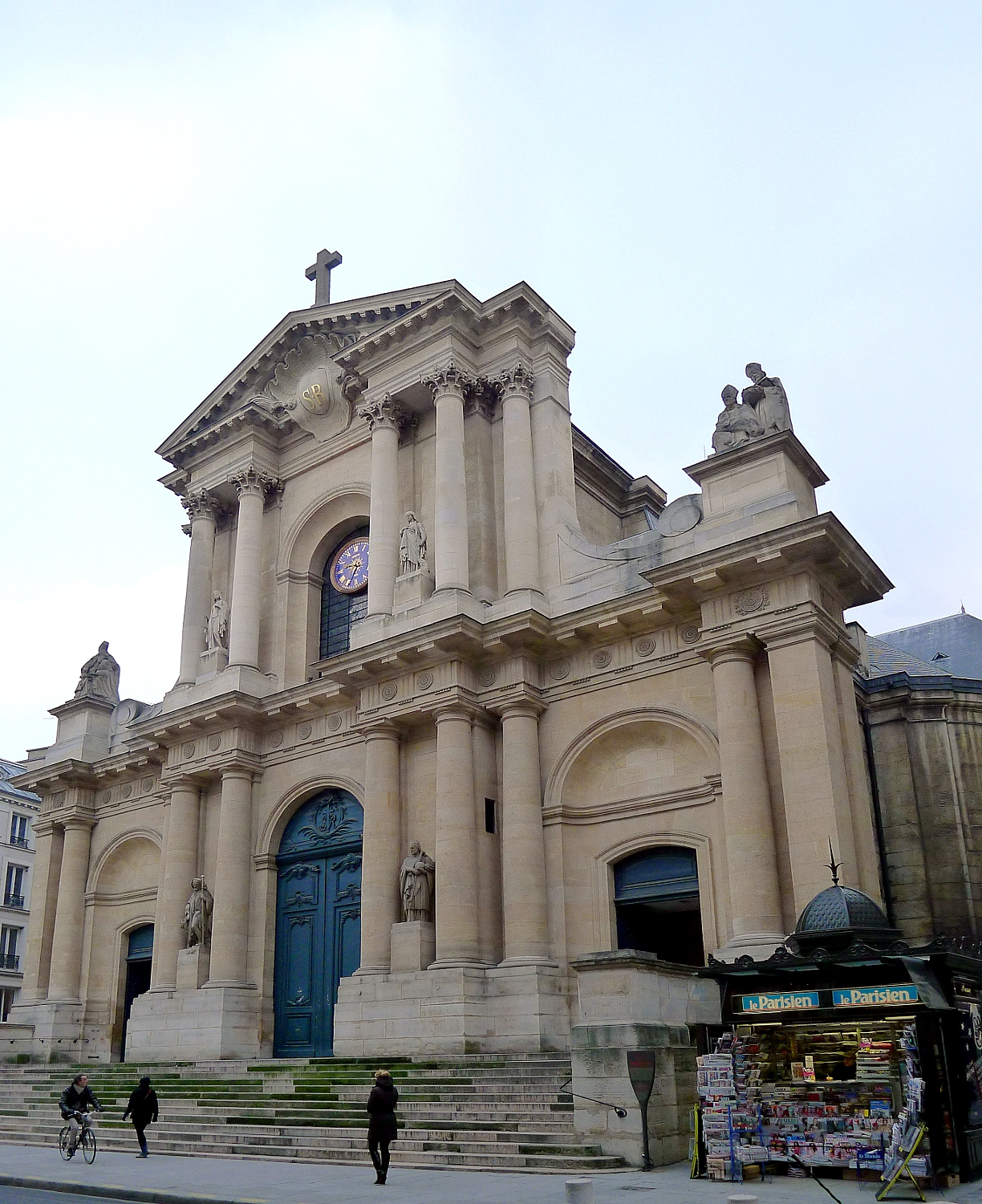
The late baroque church of Saint-Roch at 196 rue Saint-Honoré (1738–39) by Robert de Cotte and Jules-Robert de Cotte

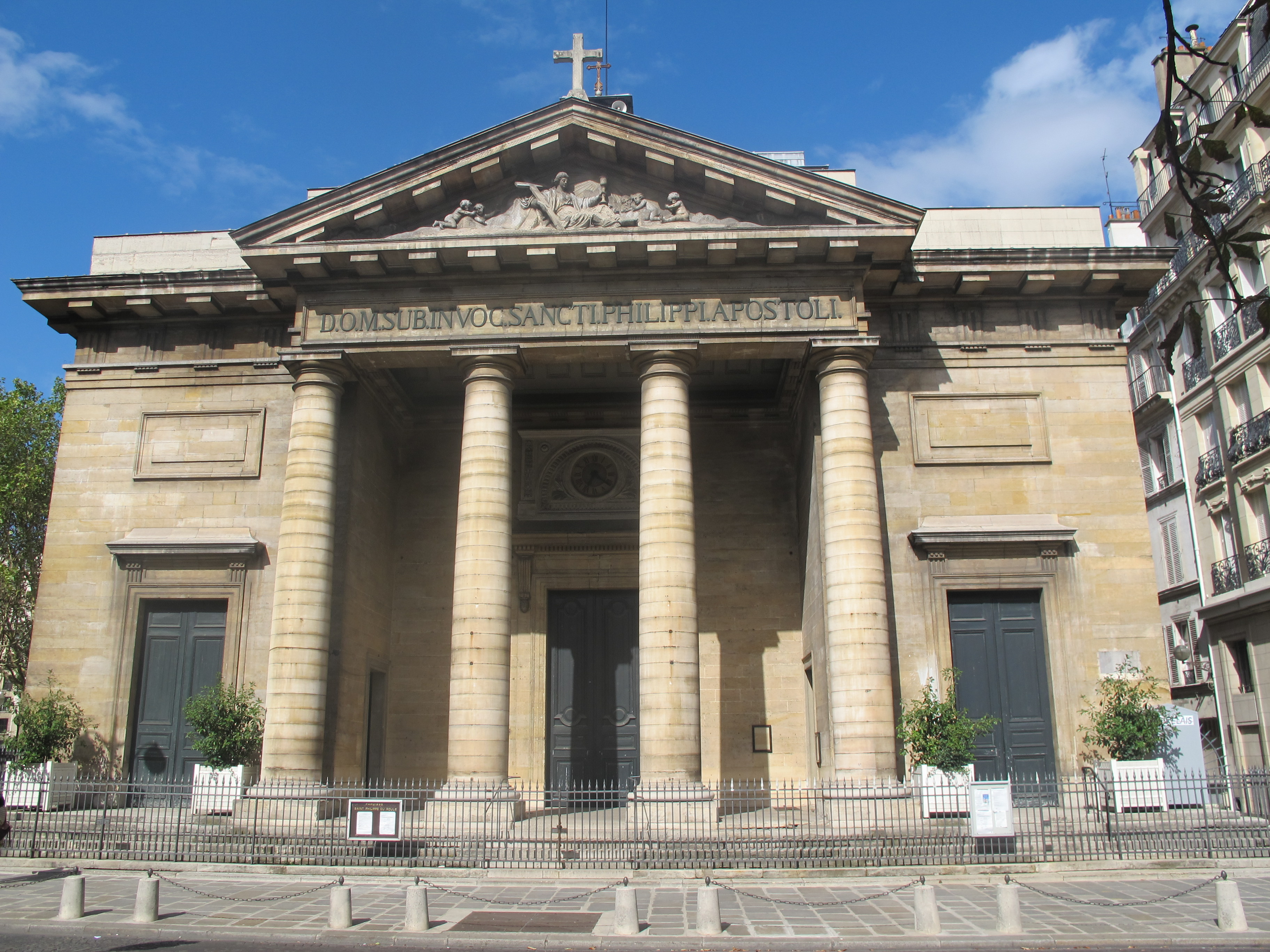
The neoclassical façade of the church of Saint-Philippe-de-Roule (1764–84), by Jean-François Chalgrin

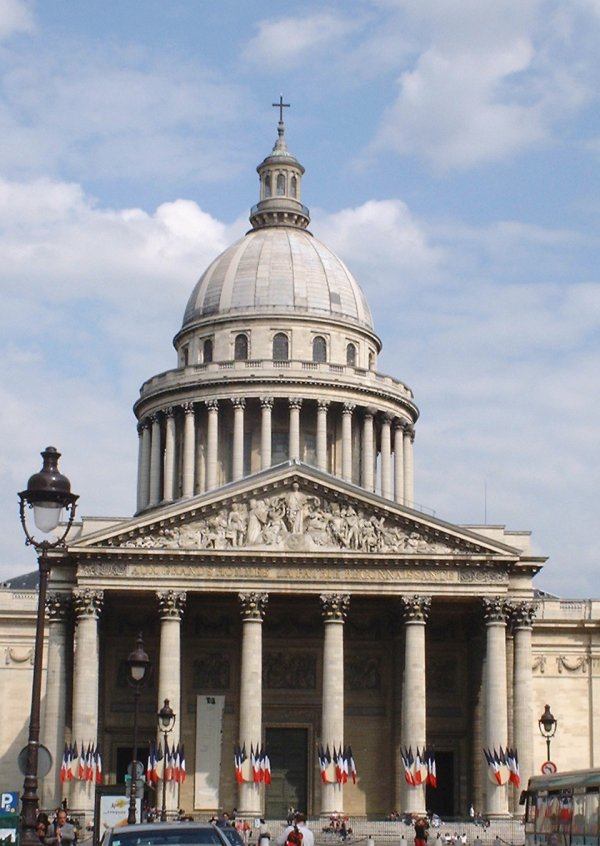
The Church of Saint-Geneviéve, now the Panthéon (1764–90) by Jacques-Germain Soufflot

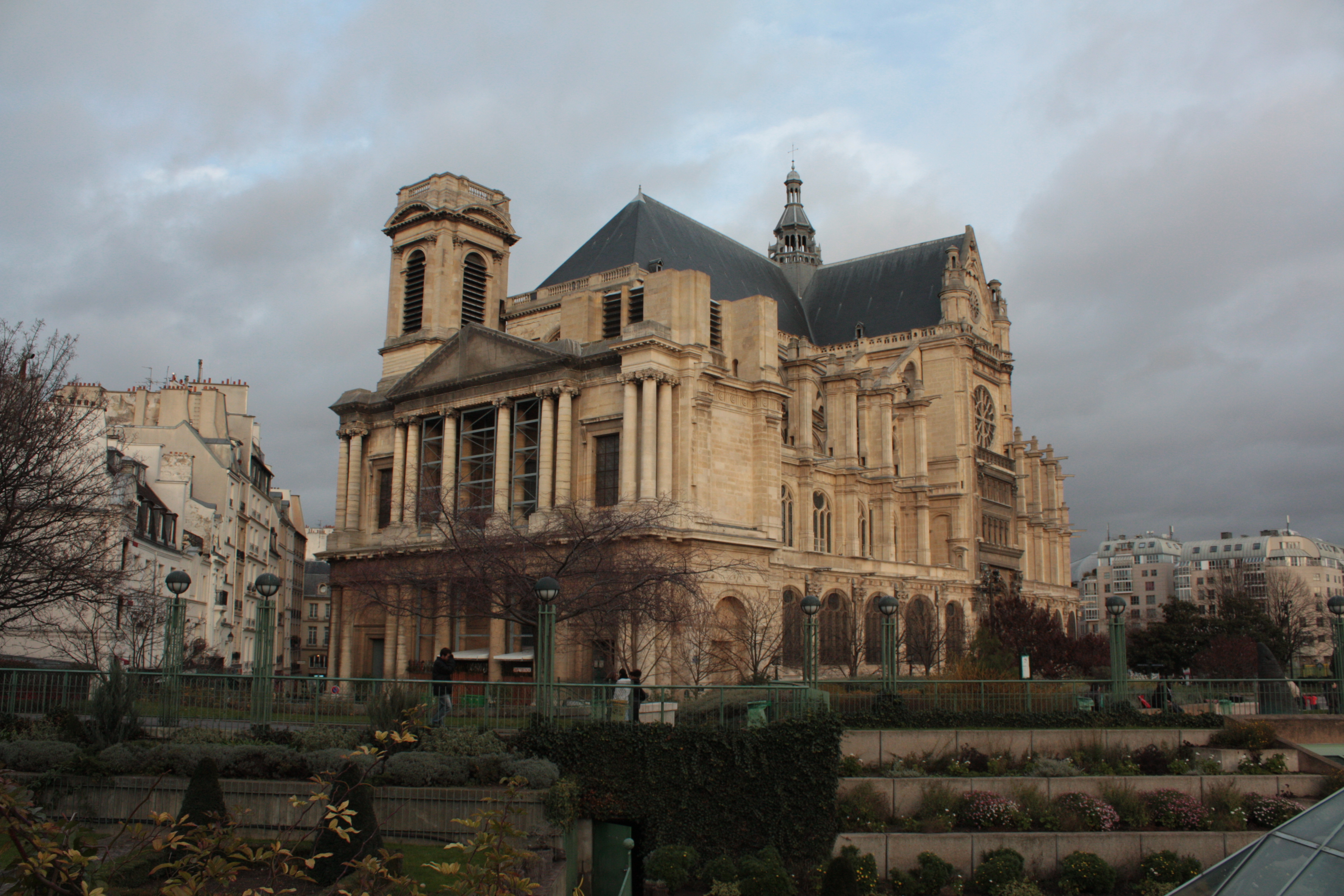
The unfinished west façade of the Church of Saint-Eustache, Paris, with its single bell tower (1754–78)

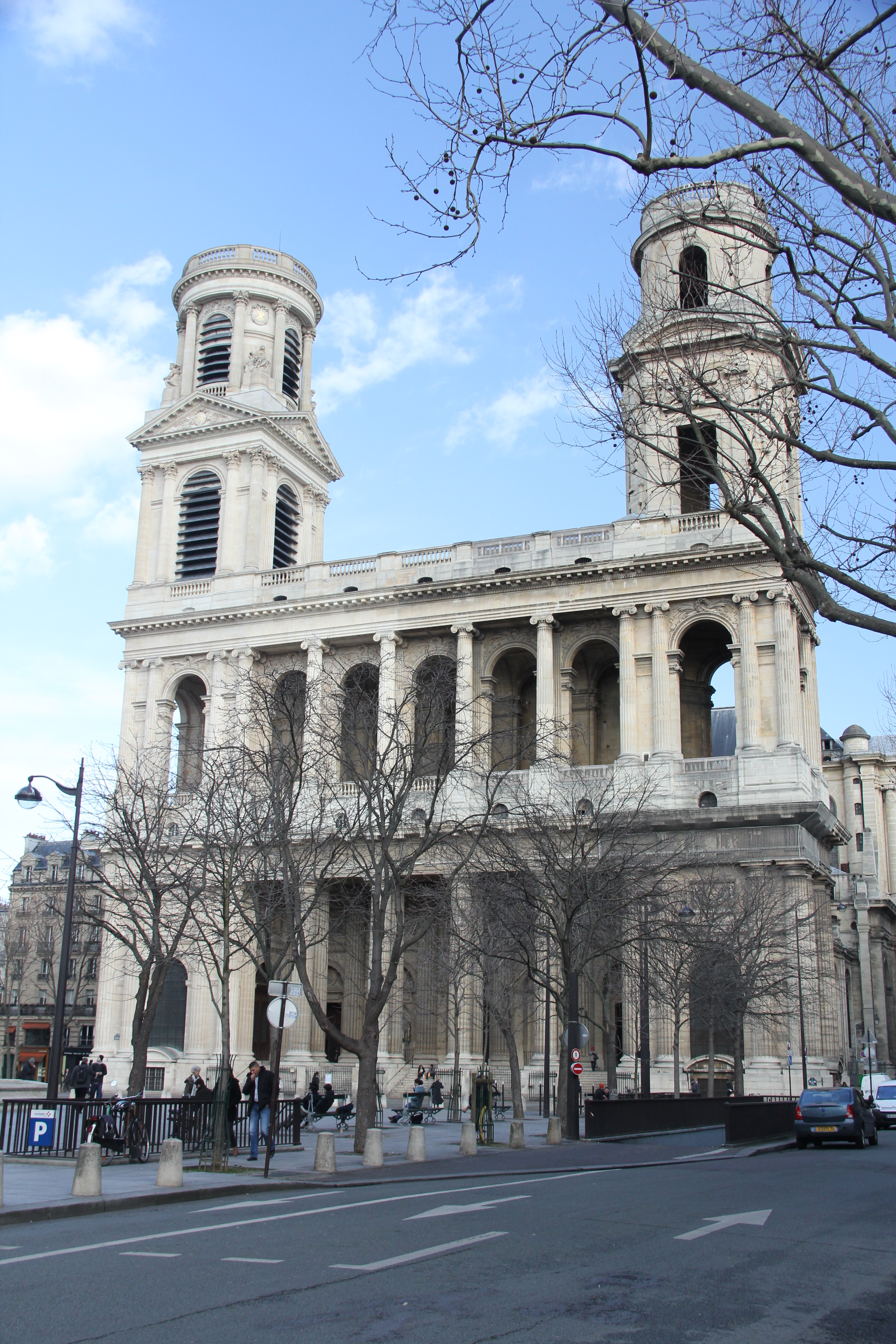
Facade of the Church of Saint-Sulpice (1732–80) by Jean-Nicolas Servandoni, then Oudot de Maclaurin and Jean-François Chalgrin

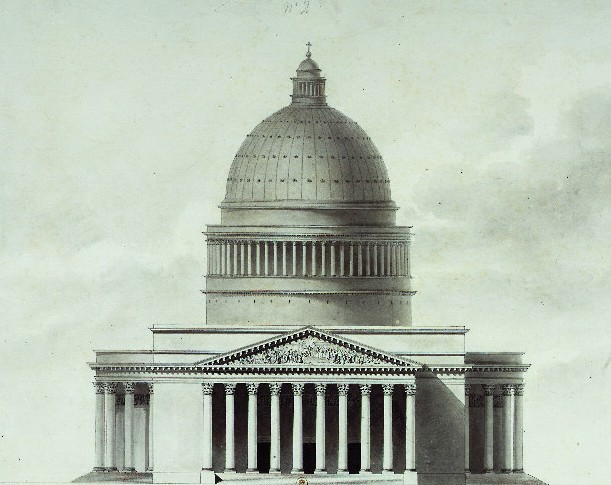
Project of Couture for the Church of La Madeleine (1777)

Churches in the first half of the 18th century, such as the church of Saint-Roche at 196 rue Saint-Honoré (1738–39) by Robert de Cotte and Jules-Robert de Cotte, stayed with the late baroque style of superimposed orders. Later churches ventured into neoclassicism, at least on the exterior. The most prominent example of a neoclassical church was the Church of Saint Genevieve (1764–90), the future Pantheon. The church of Saint-Philippe-du-Roule at 153 rue du Faubourg-Saint-Honoré (8th arr.) (1764–84) by Jean-François Chalgrin had an exterior inspired by the early Paleo-Christian church, though the nave in the interior was more traditional. The Church of Saint-Sulpice in the 6th arrondissement, by Jean-Nicolas Servandont, then by Oudot de Maclaurin and Jean-François Chalgrin was given a classical façade and two bell towers (1732–80). Funding was exhausted before the second tower was finished, leaving the two towers different in style. The church of Saint-Eustache on rue-du-Jour (1st arr.) an example of both Gothic and Renaissance architecture, had its west faced redone by Jean Hardouin-Mansart and then Pierre-Louis Moreau-Desproux, into a neoclassical façade with two orders (1754–78), and was intended to have two towers, but only one was finished.

A large church with a dome, similar to Les Invalides, had been planned for the Place de la Madeleine beginning in the 1760s. the King laid the cornerstone on April 3, 1763, but work halted in 1764. The architect, Pierre Contant d'Ivry, died in 1777, and was replaced by his pupil Guillaume-Martin Couture, who decided instead to base his church on the Roman Pantheon; a classic colonnade topped by a massive dome. At the start of the Revolution of 1789, however, only the foundations and the grand portico had been finished.

=== Régence and Louis XV residential architecture ===
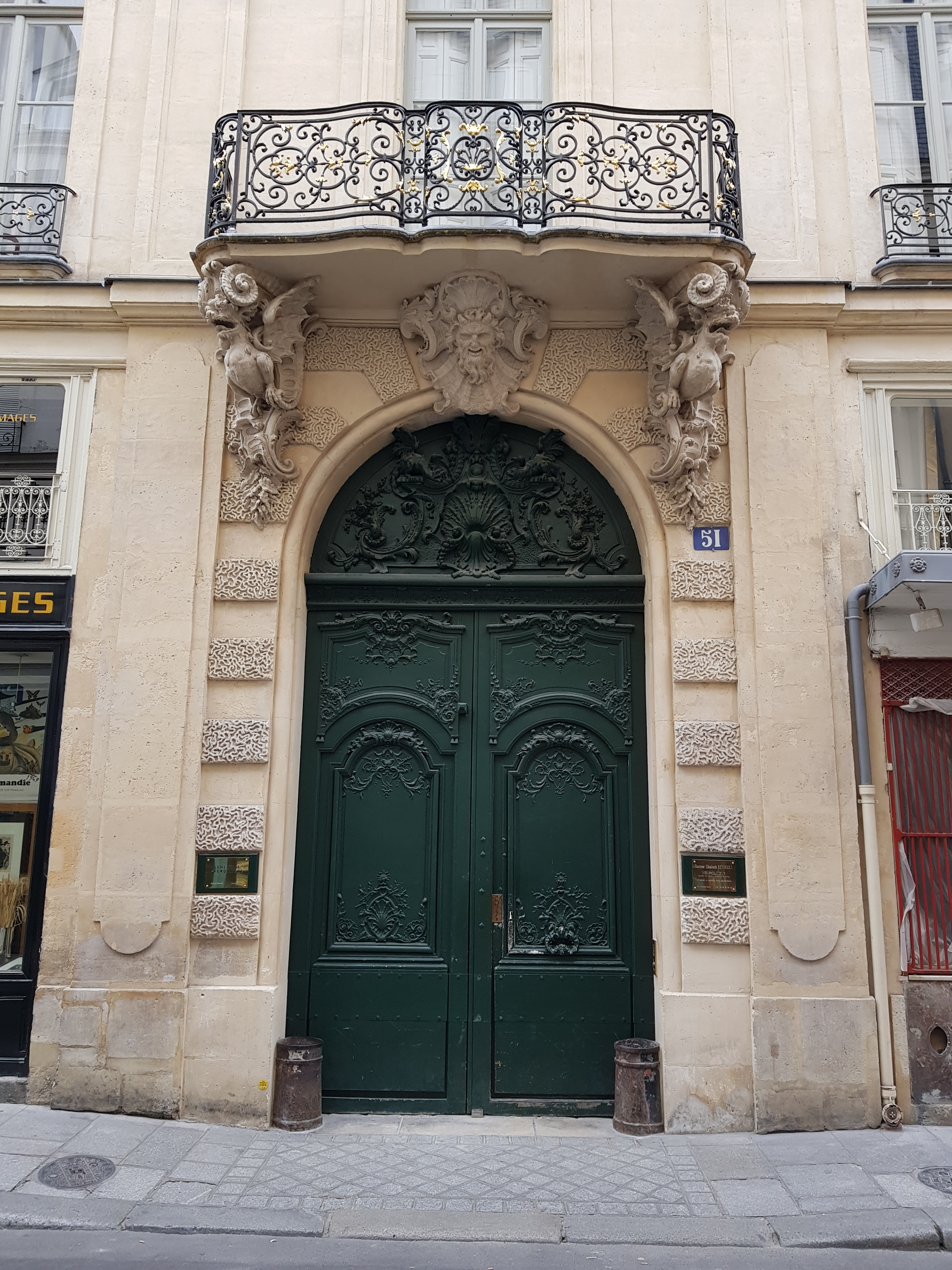
Detail of the Hôtel de Chenizot, 51 rue Saint-Louis-en-Ile, by Pierre-Vigné de Vigny (about 1720)

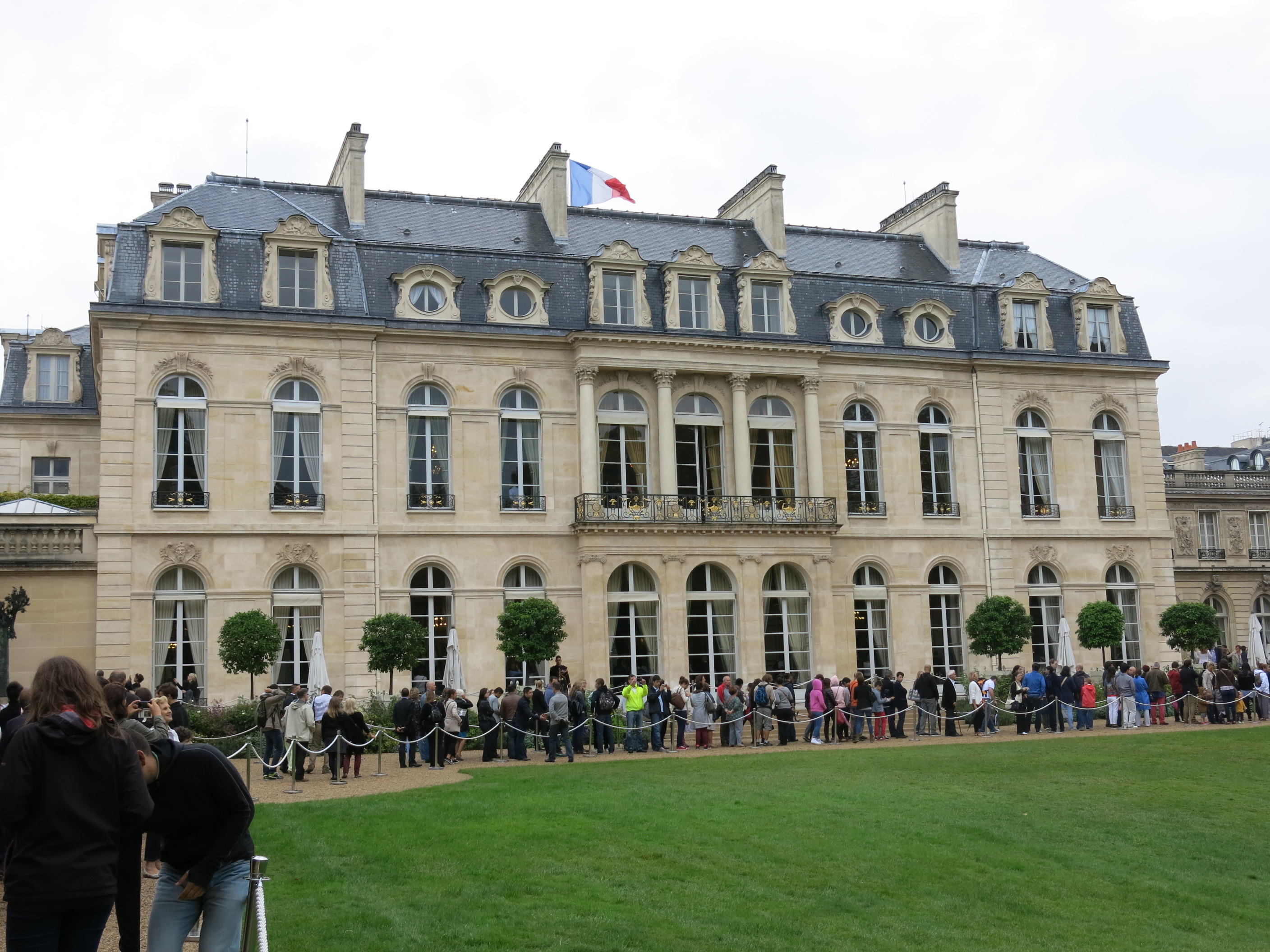
The Hotel d'Évreux, now the Élysée Palace, residence of the President of France (1718–20), by Armand-Claude Mollet

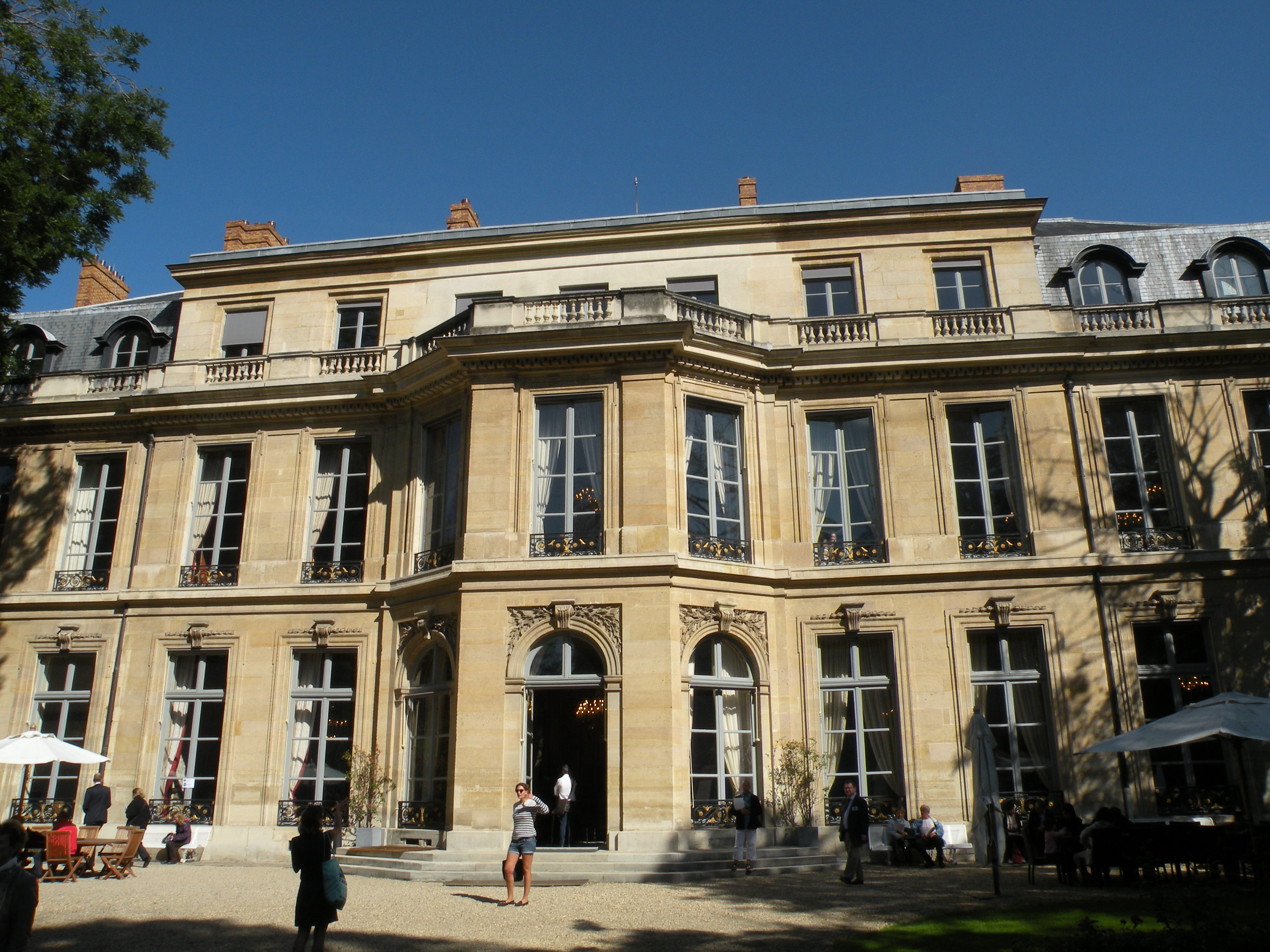
The avants-corps of the Hôtel du Châtelet (1770) by Mathurin Cherpitel

The Régence and then the rule of Louis XV saw a gradual evolution of the style of the hôtel particulier, or mansion. The ornate wrought-iron balcony appeared on residences, along with other ornamental details called rocaille or rococo, often borrowed from Italy. The style first appeared on houses in the Marais, then in the neighborhoods of Saint-Honoré and Saint-Germain, where larger building lots were available. These became the most fashionable neighborhoods by the end of the 18th century. The new hôtels were often ornamented with curve façades, rotundas and lateral pavilions, and had their façades decorated with sculpted mascaron fruit, cascades of trophies and other sculptural decoration. The interiors were richly decorated with carved wood panels. The houses usually looked out onto courtyards on the front and gardens to the rear. The Hôtel de Chenizot, 51 rue Saint-Louis-en-Ile, by Pierre-Vigné de Vigny (about 1720), was a good example of the new style; it was a 17th-century house transformed by a new rocaille façade.

=== Urbanism – the Place de la Concorde ===
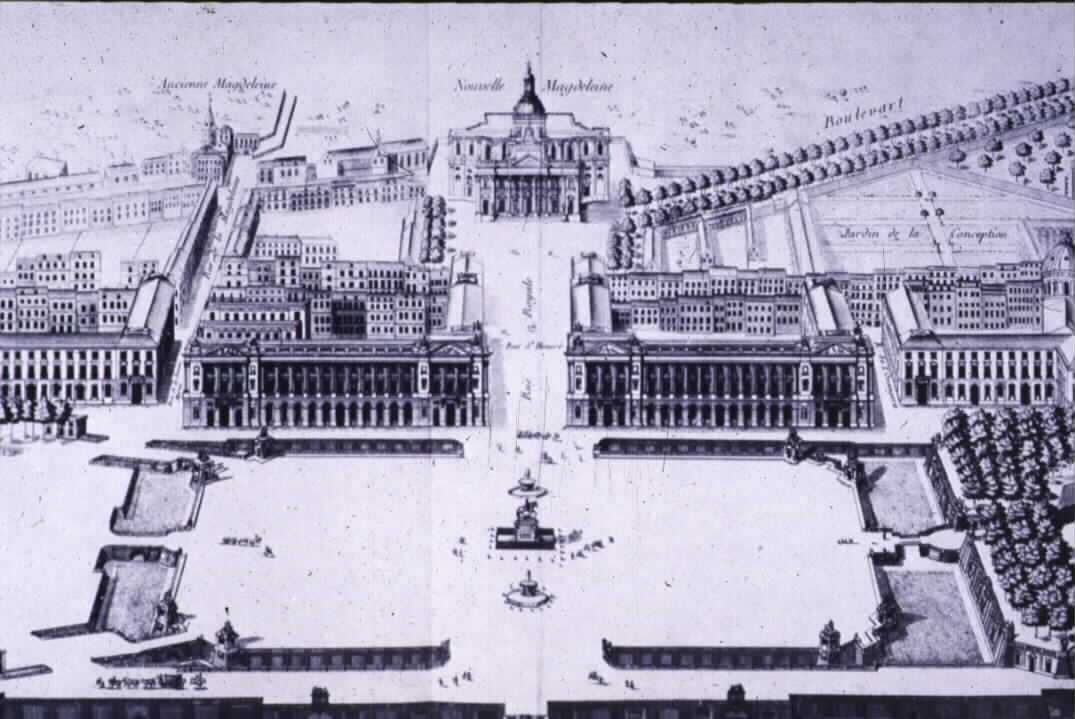
Design of Ange-Jacques Gabriel for Place Louis XV, now the Place de la Concorde (1766–75)

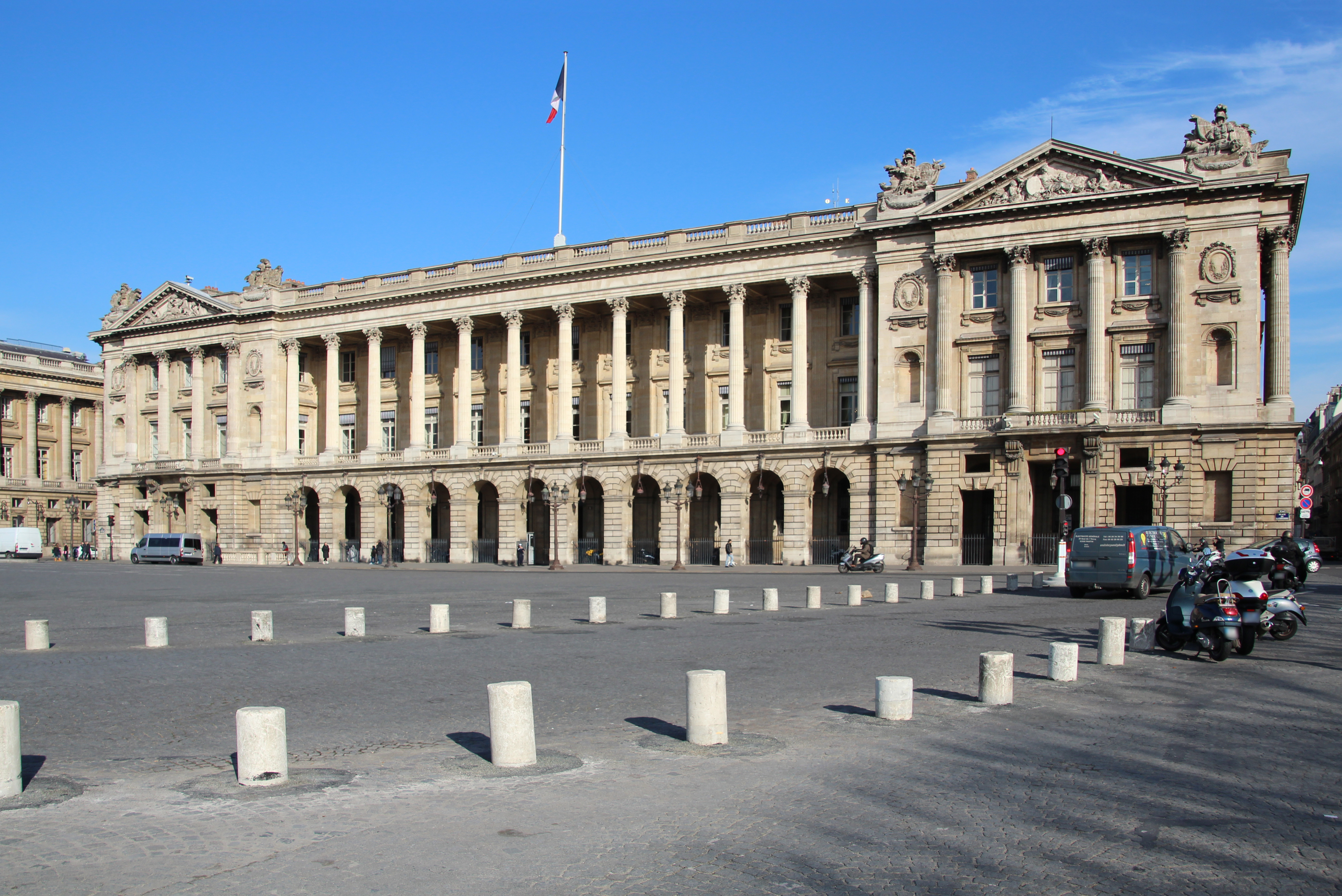
Facade of the Hôtel de la Marine on Place de la Concorde (1766–75), by Ange-Jacques Gabriel

In 1748, the Academy of Arts commissioned a monumental statue of the king on horseback by the sculptor Bouchardon, and the Academy of Architecture was assigned to create a square, to be called Place Louis XV, where it could be erected. The site selected was the marshy open space between the Seine, the moat and bridge to the Tuileries Garden, and the Champs-Élysées, which led to the Place de l'Étoile, convergence of hunting trails on the western edge of the city (now Place Charles de Gaulle). The winning plans for the square and buildings next to it were drawn by the architect Ange-Jacques Gabriel. Gabriel designed two large hôtels with a street between them, Rue Royale, designed to give a clear view of the statue in the center of the square. The façades of the two hôtels, with long colonnades and classical pediments, were inspired by Perrault's neoclassical façade of the Louvre. Construction began in 1754, and the statue was put in place and dedicated on 23 February 1763. The two large hôtels were still unfinished, but the façades were finished in 1765–66. The Place was the theatre for some of the most dramatic events of the French Revolution, including the executions of Louis XVI and Marie Antoinette.

=== Urbanism under Louis XVI ===
The later part of the 18th century saw the development of new residential blocks, particularly on the left bank at Odéon and Saint-Germain, and on the right bank in the first and second arrondissements. The most fashionable neighborhoods moved from the Marais toward the west. with large residential buildings constructed in a simplified and harmonious neoclassical style. The ground floors were often occupied by arcades to give pedestrians shelter from the rain and the traffic in the streets. Strict new building regulations were put into place in 1783 and 1784, which regulated the height of new buildings in relation to the width of the street, regulating the line of the cornice, the number of stories and the slope of the roofs. Under a 1784 decree of the Parlement of Paris, the height of most new buildings was limited to 54 pieds or 17.54 meters, with the height of the attic depending upon the width of the building.

=== Paris architecture on the eve of the Revolution ===
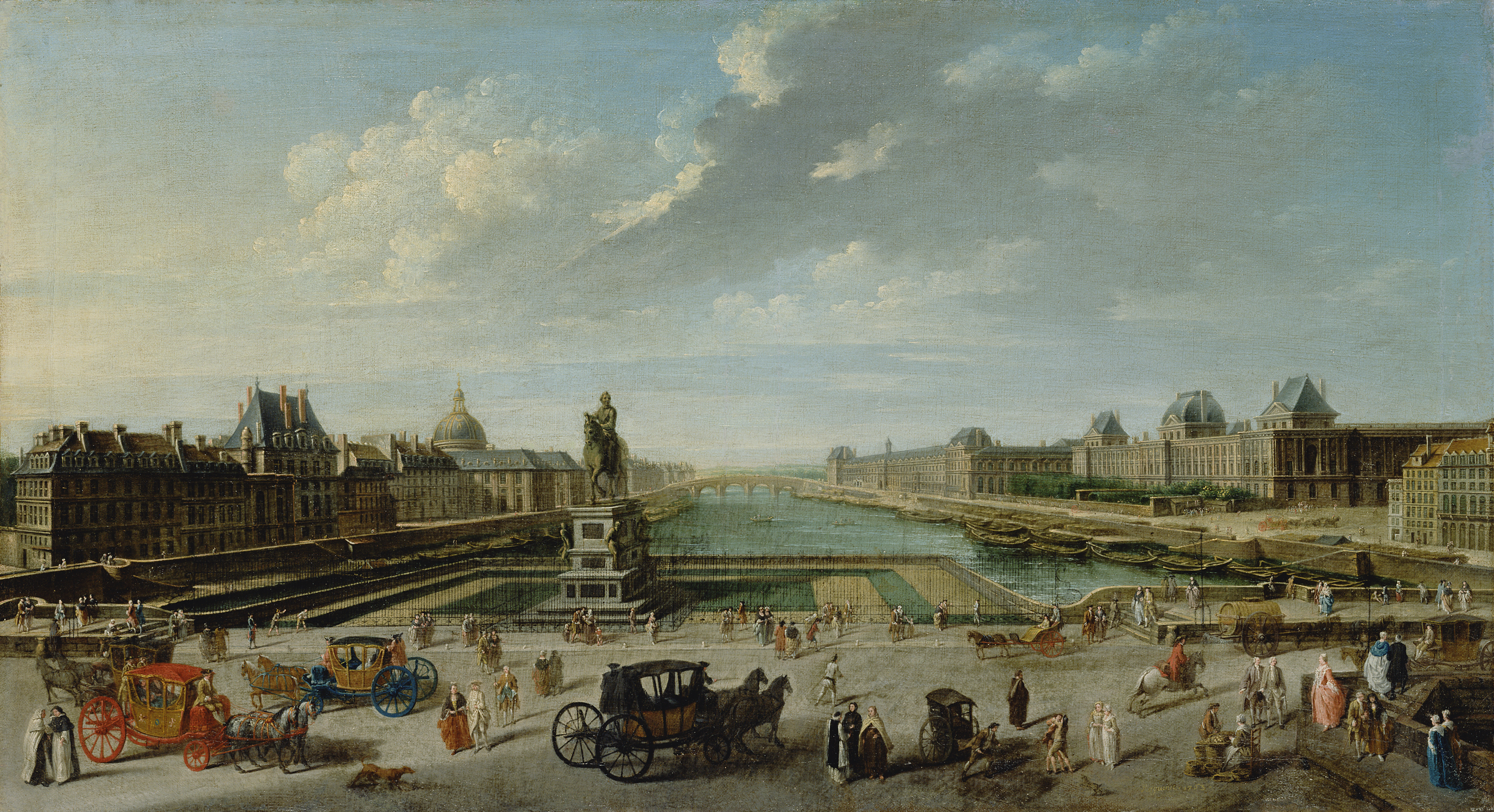
View of Paris from the Pont Neuf by Jean-Baptiste Raguenet (1783)

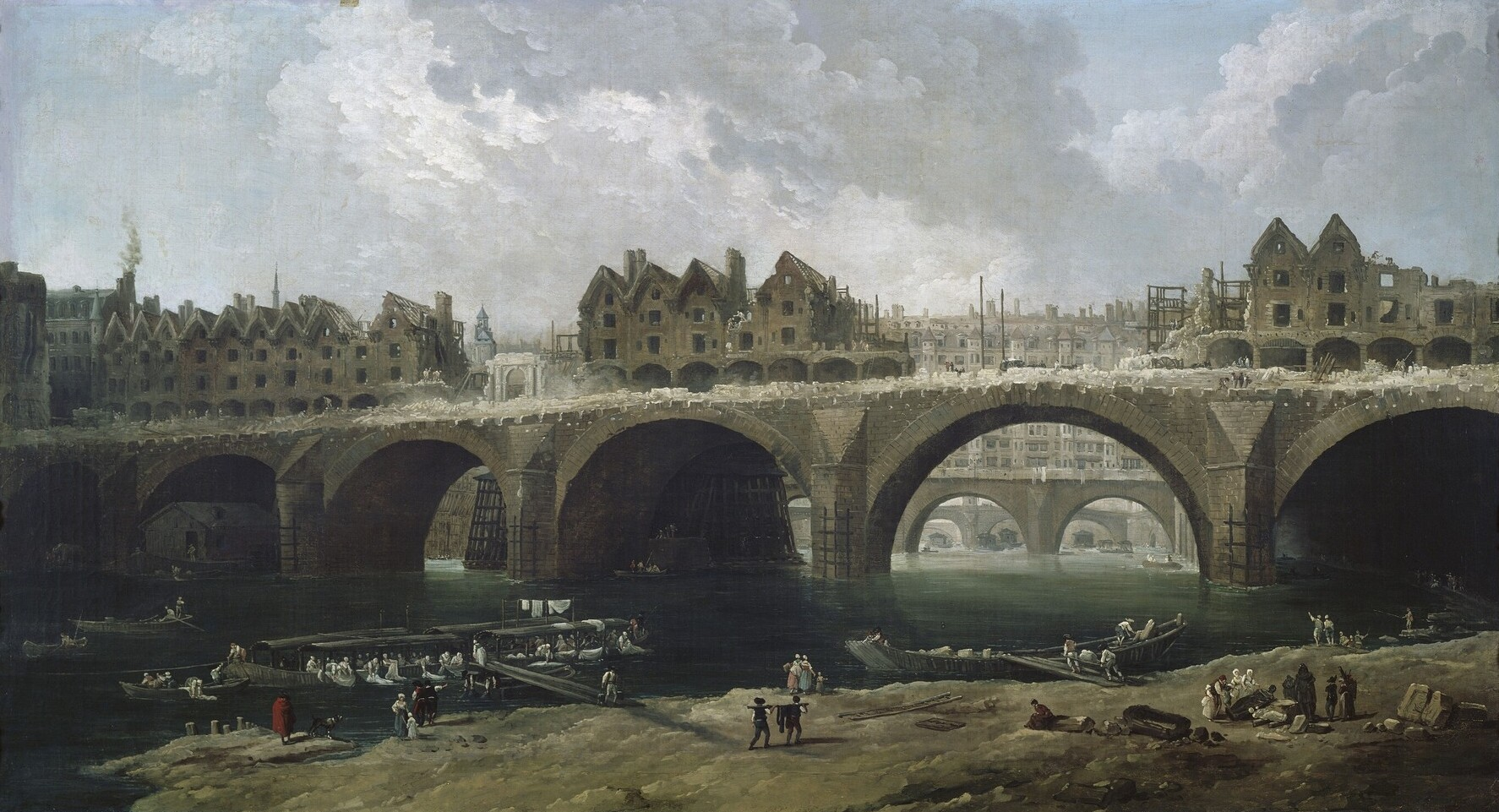
Demolition of houses on the Pont Notre-Dame, by Hubert Robert (1786)

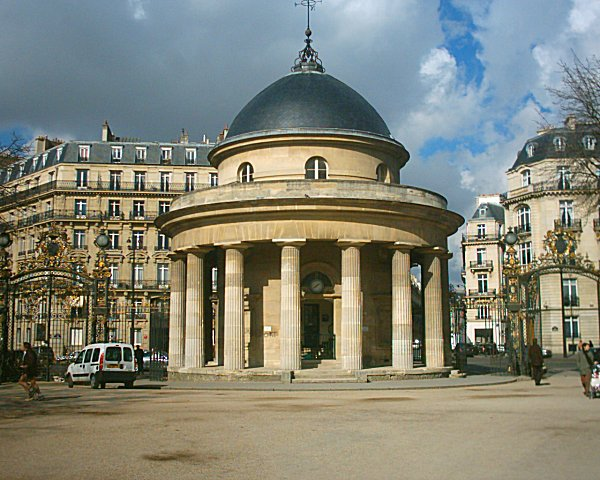
A neoclassical customs barrier (1787–90), now part of Parc Monceau, by Claude Nicolas Ledoux

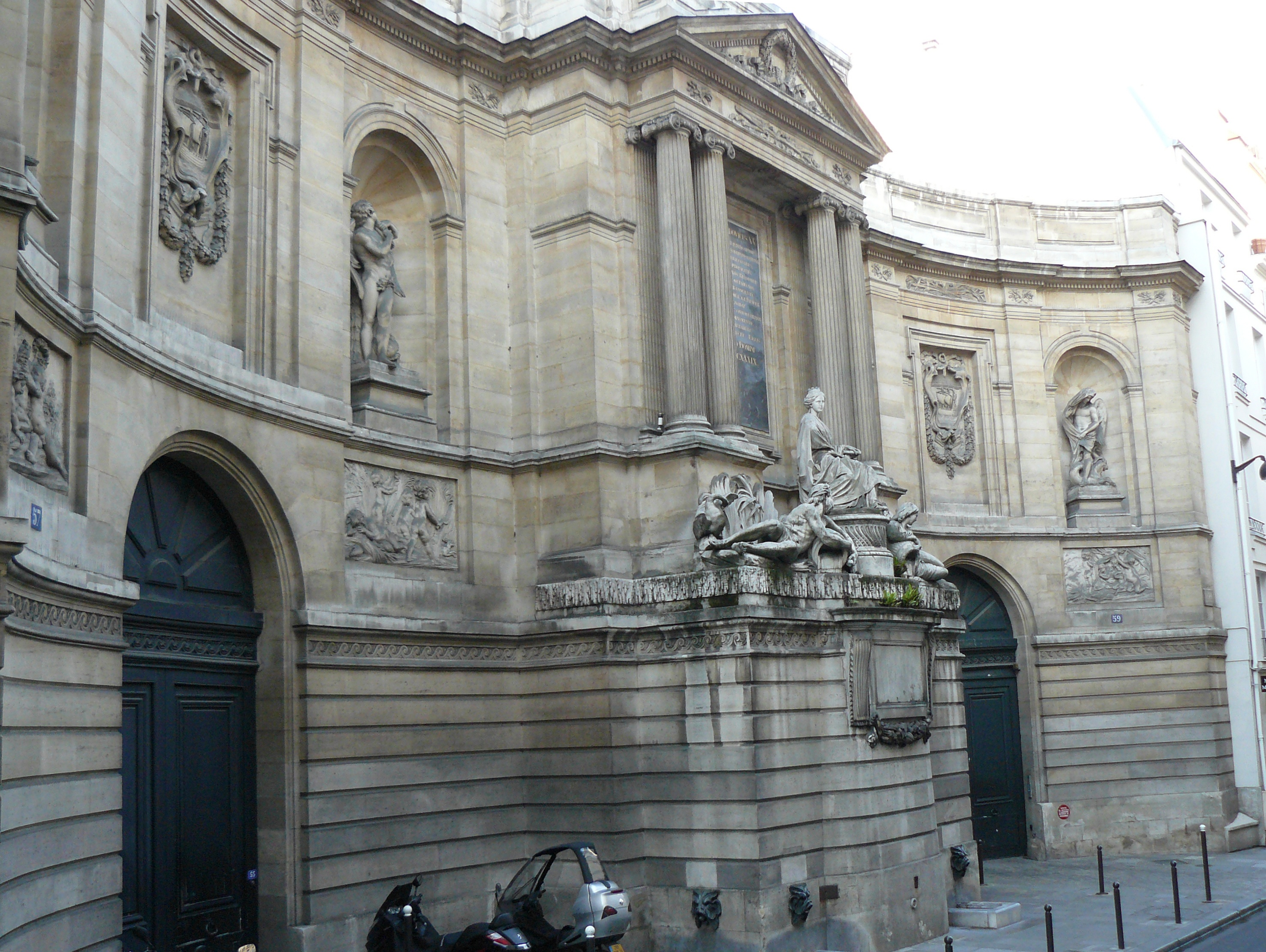
The Fontaine des Quatre-Saisons (1774) was monumental, but its tiny spouts provided little water

Paris in the 18th century had many beautiful buildings, but it was not a beautiful city. The philosopher Jean-Jacques Rousseau described his disappointment when he first arrived in Paris in 1731: I expected a city as beautiful as it was grand, of an imposing appearance, where you saw only superb streets, and palaces of marble and gold. Instead, when I entered by the Faubourg Saint-Marceau, I saw only narrow, dirty and foul-smelling streets, and villainous black houses, with an air of unhealthiness; beggars, poverty; wagons-drivers, menders of old garments; and vendors of tea and old hats."

In 1749, in Embellissements de Paris, Voltaire wrote: "We blush with shame to see the public markets, set up in narrow streets, displaying their filth, spreading infection, and causing continual disorders… Immense neighbourhoods need public places. The center of the city is dark, cramped, hideous, something from the time of the most shameful barbarism."

The uniform neoclassical style all around the city was not welcomed by everyone. Just before the Revolution the journalist Louis-Sébastien Mercier wrote: "How monotonous is the genius of our architects! How they live on copies, on eternal repetition! They don't know how to make the smallest building without columns… They all more or less resemble temples."

Even functional buildings were built in the neoclassical style; the grain market (now the Chamber of Commerce) was given a neoclassical dome (1763–69) by Nicolas Le Camus de Mézières. Between 1785 and 1787, the royal government built a new wall around the edges of the city (The Wall of the Ferme générale) to prevent smuggling of goods into the city. it had fifty-five barriers, many of them in the form of Doric temples, designed by Claude Nicolas Ledoux. A few still exist, notably at Parc Monceau. The wall was highly unpopular and was an important factor in turning opinion against Louis XVI, and provoking the French Revolution.

In 1774 Louis XV had constructed a monumental fountain, the Fontaine des Quatre-Saisons, richly decorated with classical sculpture by Bouchardon glorifying the King, at 57–59 rue de la Grenelle. While the fountain was huge, and dominated the narrow street, it originally had only two small spouts, from which residents of the neighborhood could fill their water containers. It was criticized by Voltaire in a letter to the Count de Caylus in 1739, as the fountain was still under construction:

I have no doubt that Bouchardon will make of this fountain a fine piece of architecture; but what kind of fountain has only two faucets where the water porters will come to fill their buckets? This isn't the way fountains are built in Rome to beautify the city. We need to lift ourselves out of taste that is gross and shabby. Fountains should be built in public places, and viewed from all the gates. There isn't a single public place in the vast faubourg Saint-Germain; that makes my blood boil. Paris is like the statue of Nabuchodonosor, partly made of gold and partly made of muck.

== Revolutionary Paris ==
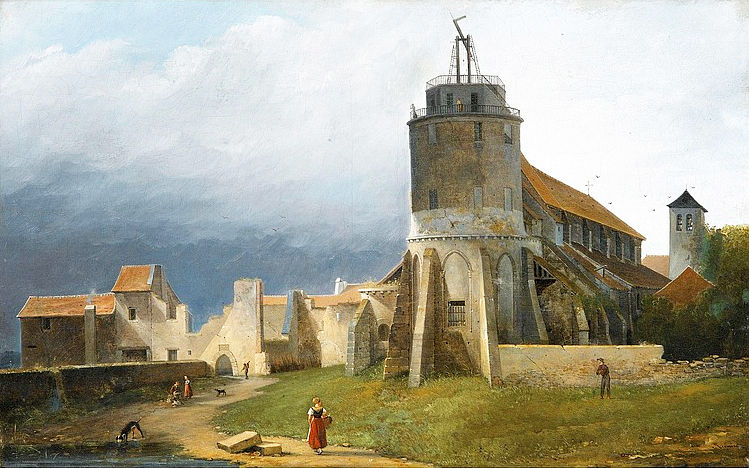
Ruins of the abbey and church of Saint-Pierre-de-Montmartre in 1820

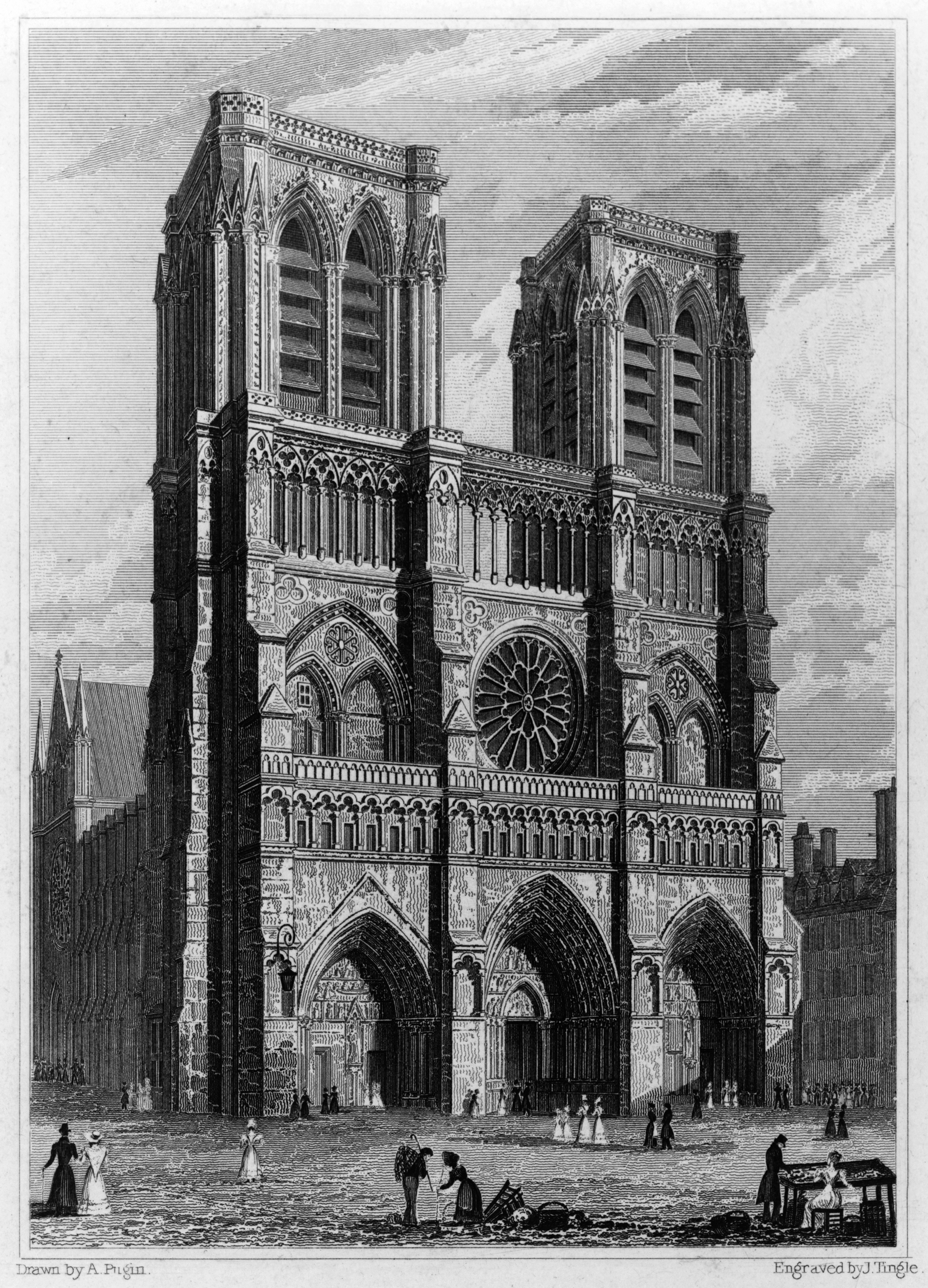
Notre Dame stripped of its statuary and spire (1820s)

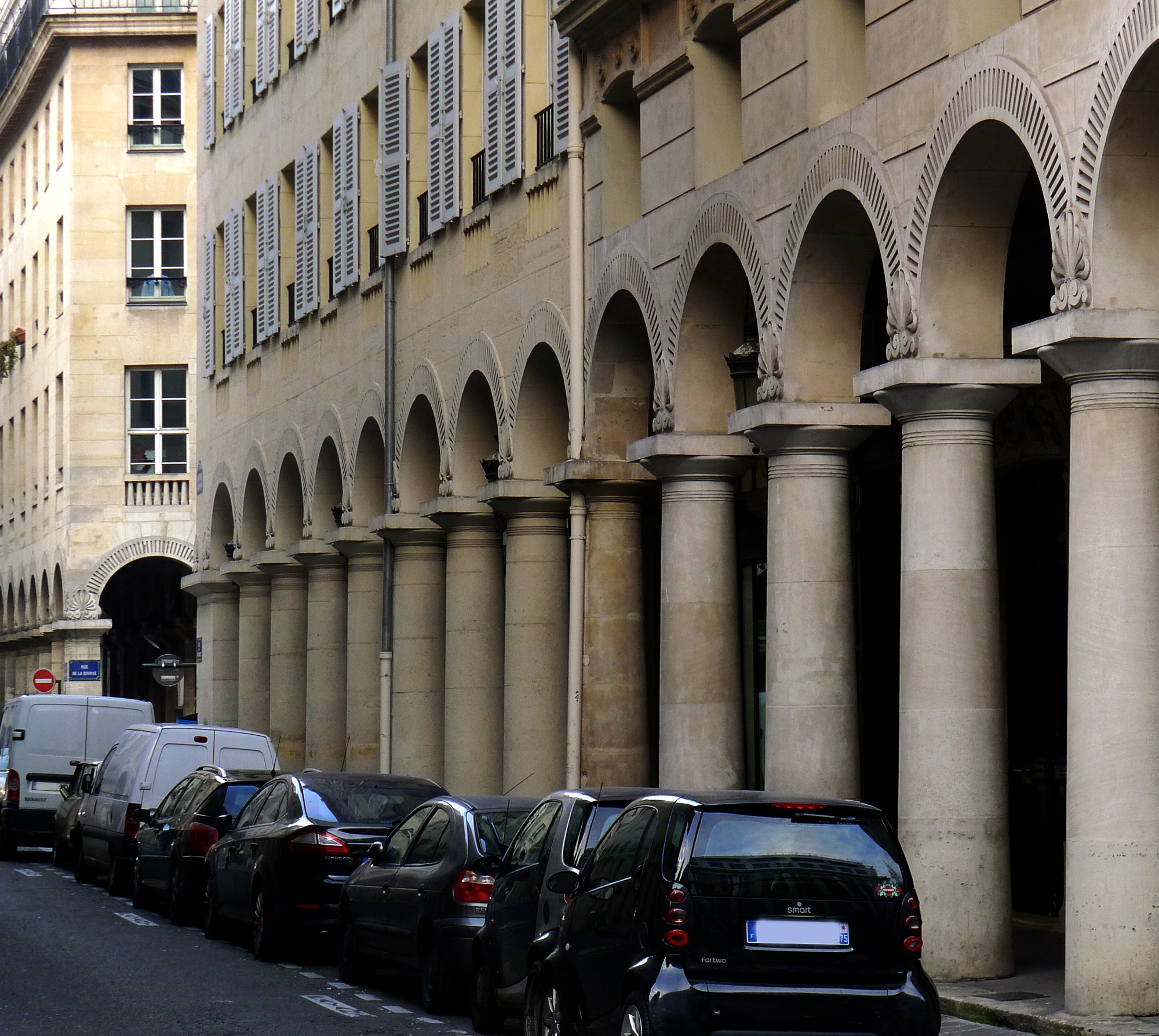
Rue des Colonnes (1793–95)

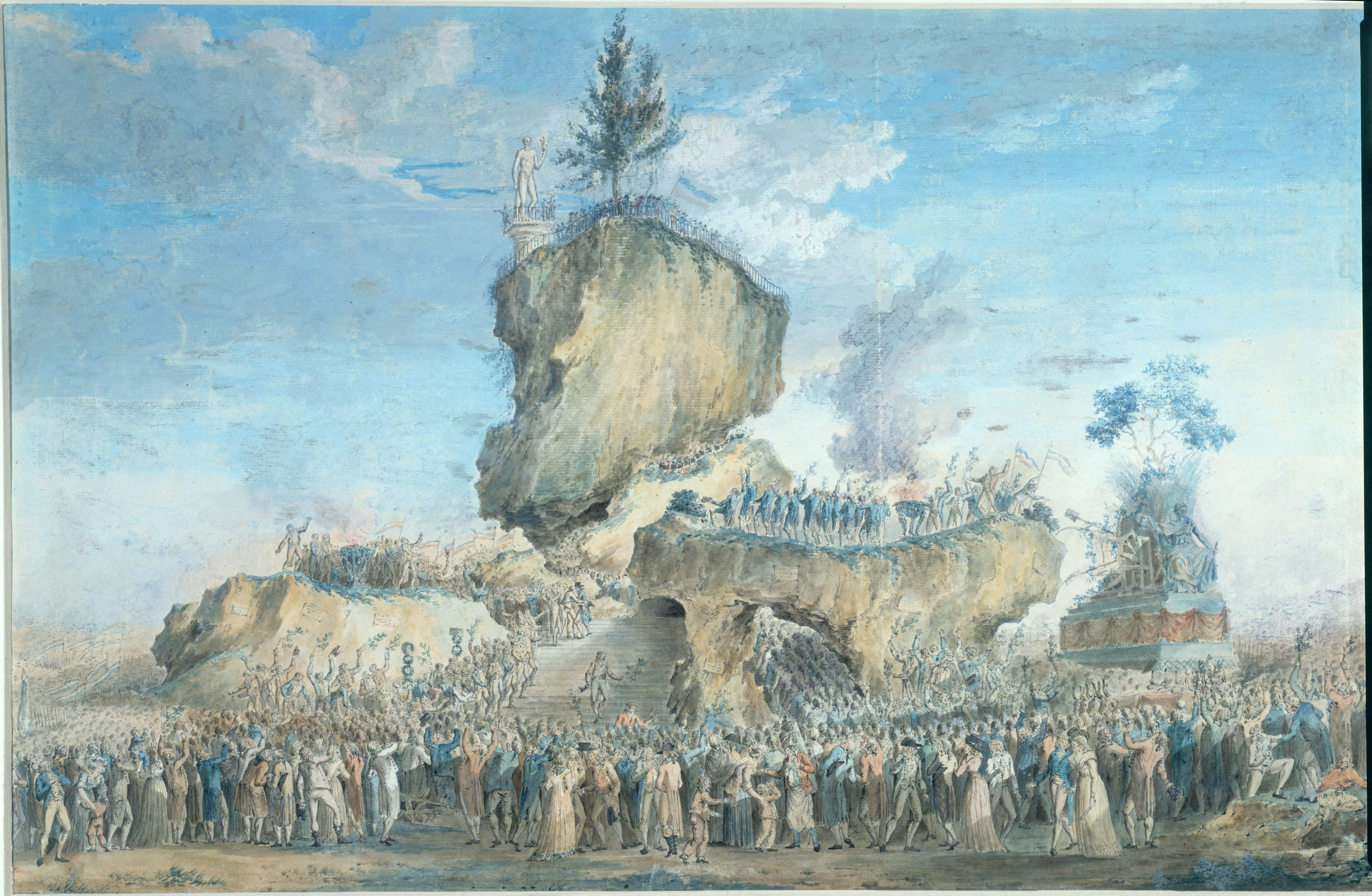
Set for the Festival of the Supreme Being (1794)

During the French Revolution, the churches of Paris were closed and nationalized, and many were badly damaged. Most destruction came not from the Revolutionaries, but from the new owners who purchased the buildings, and sometimes destroyed them for the building materials they contained. The Church of Saint-Pierre de Montmartre was destroyed, and its church left in ruins. Parts of the Abbey of Saint-Germain-des-Prés were turned into a gunpowder factory; an explosion destroyed many of the buildings outside the church. The Church of Saint-Genevieve was turned into a mausoleum for revolutionary heroes. The sculpture on the façade of the Cathedral of Notre-Dame was smashed or removed, and the spire torn down. Many of the abandoned religious buildings, particularly in outer neighborhoods of the city, were turned into factories and workshops. Much of the architecture of the Revolution was theatrical and temporary, such as the extraordinary stage sets created for the Festival of the Supreme Being on the Champs-de-Mars in 1794. However, work continued on some pre-revolutionary projects. The rue des Colonnes in the second arrondissement, designed by Nicolas-Jacques-Antoine Vestier (1793–1795), had a colonnade of simple Doric columns, characteristic of the Revolutionary period.

== The Paris of Napoleon (1800–1815) ==
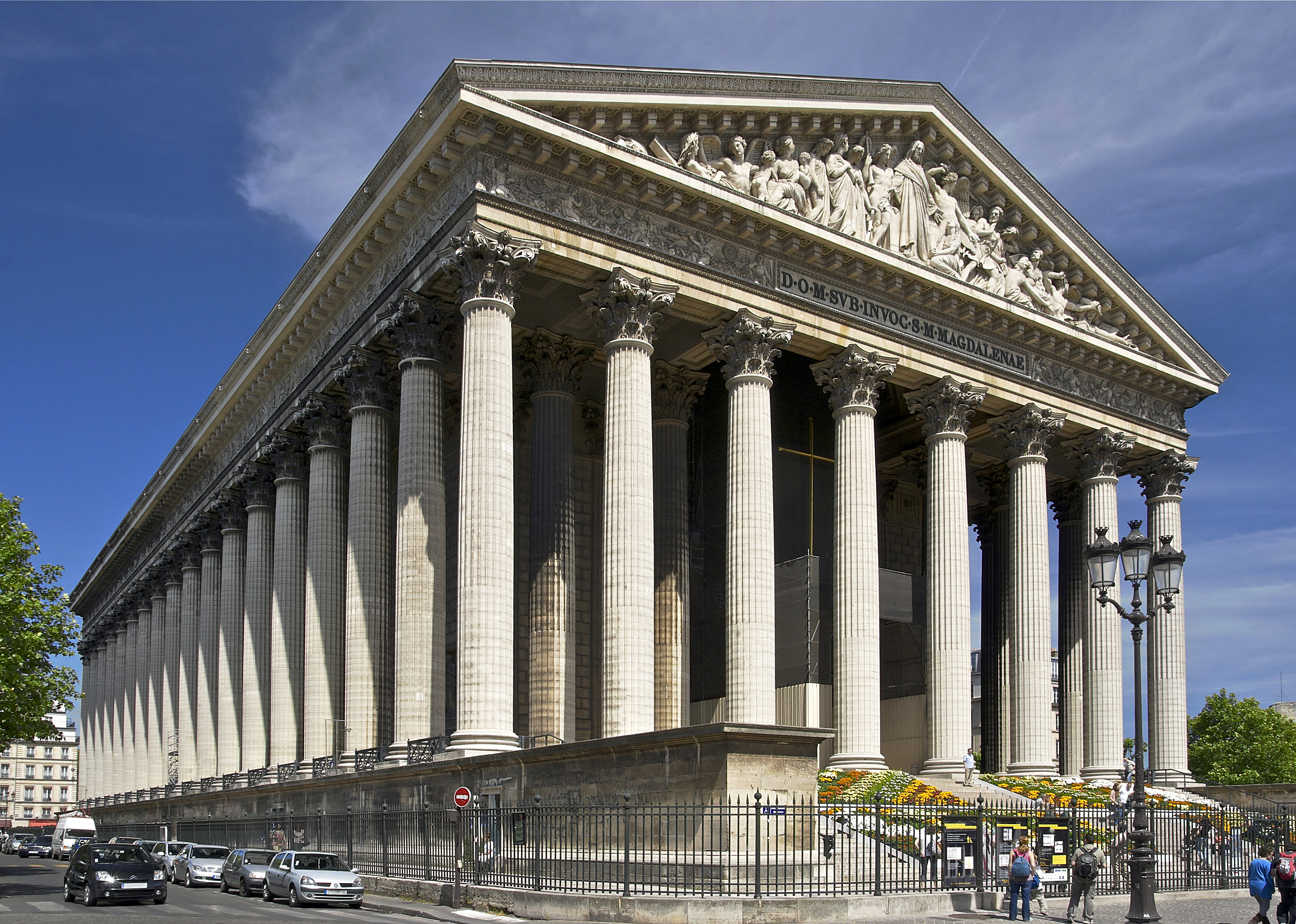
Intended by Napoleon to be the Museum of Military Glory, the structure became the church of La Madeleine (1763–1842)

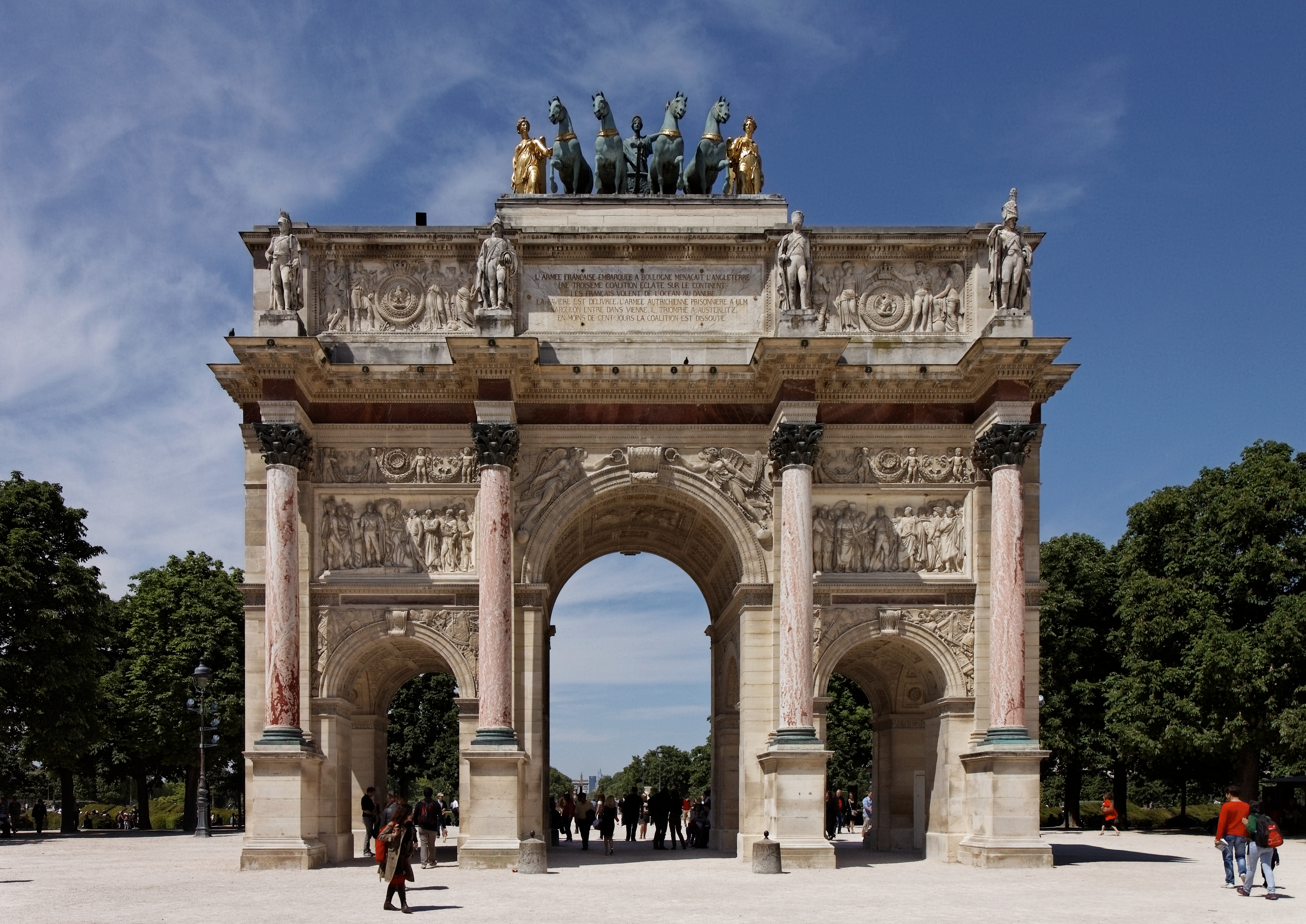
Arc de Triomphe du Carrousel (1806–10)

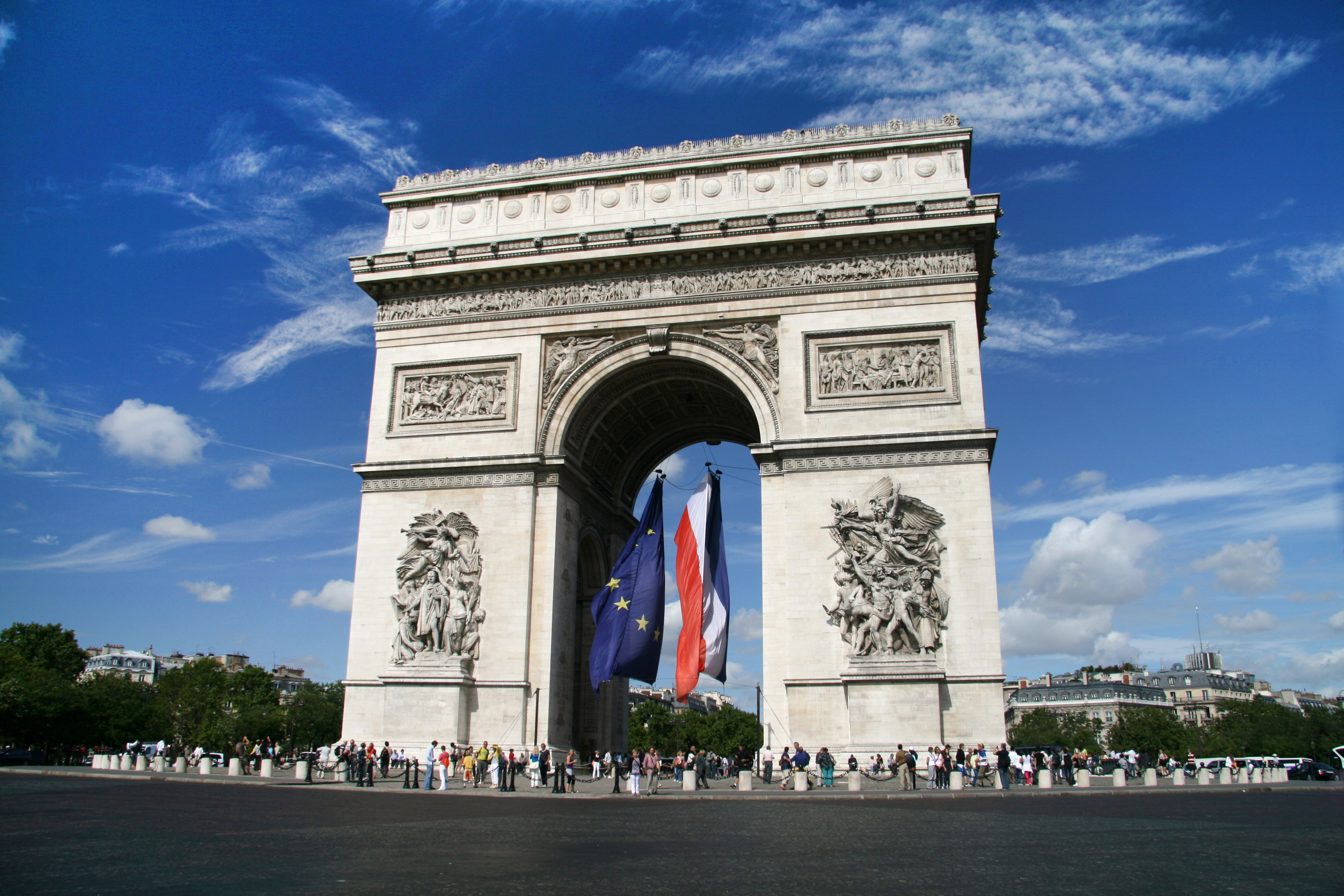
The Arc de Triomphe (1806–11) by Jean-François Chalgrin, not finished until 1836

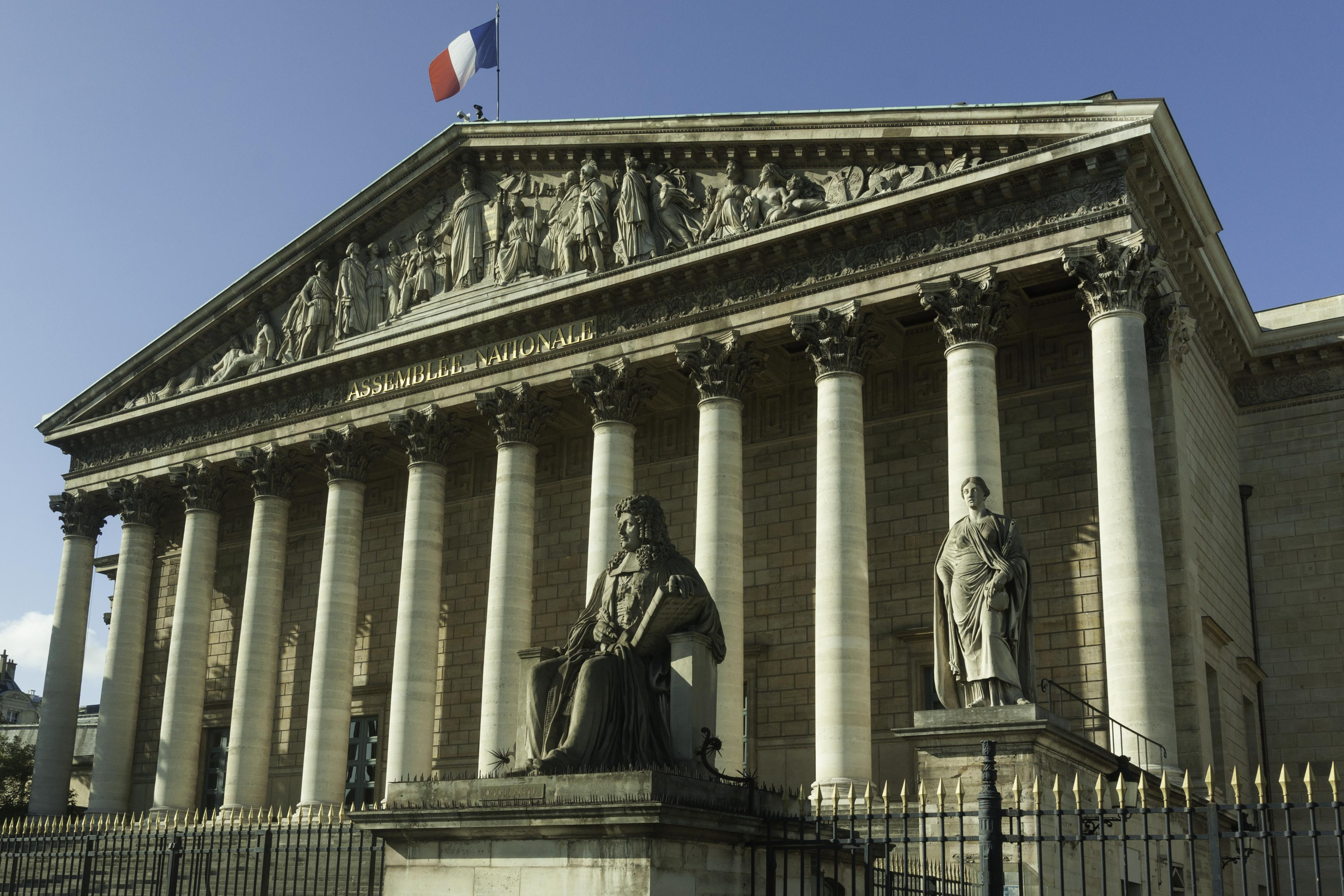
Napoleon rebuilt the façade of the Palais Bourbon, the French National Assembly, to match the Temple of Military Glory (now the church of La Madeleine) 1806)

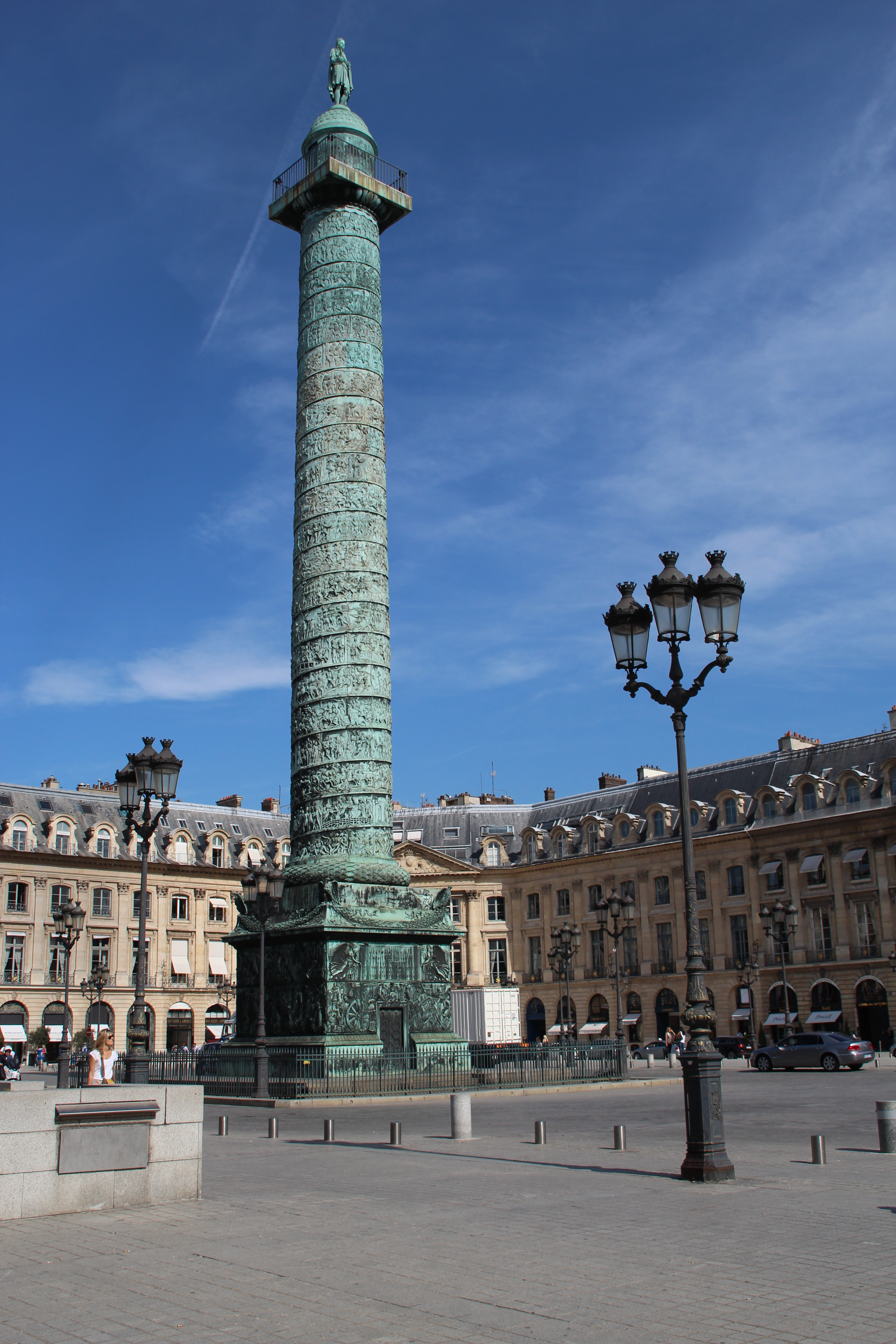
The Vendôme column, by Jacques Gondouin and Jean-Baptiste Lepére, sculpture by Étienne Bergeret (1806–1810)

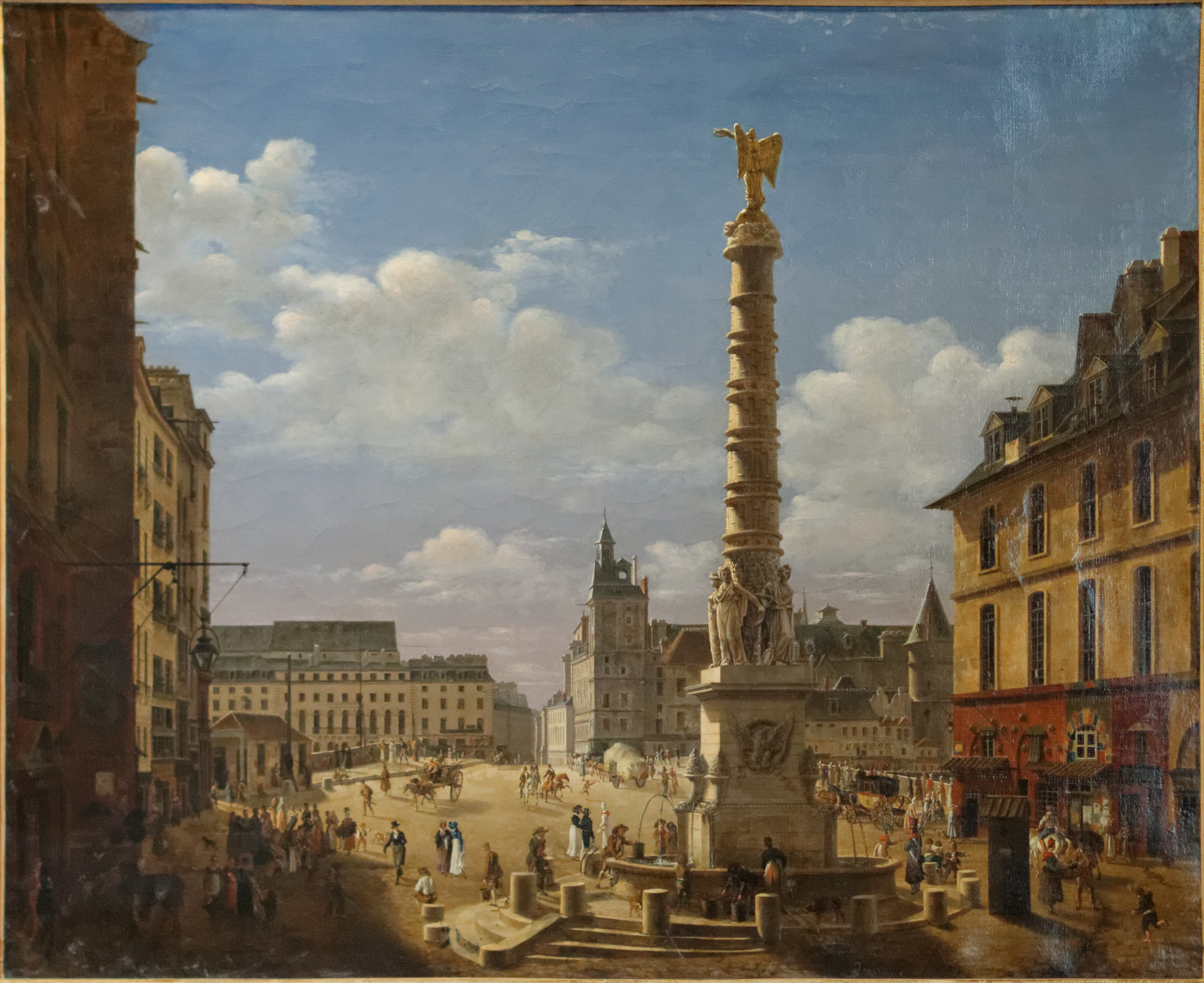
Place du Châtelet and the new Fontaine du Palmier, by Étienne Bouhot (1810)

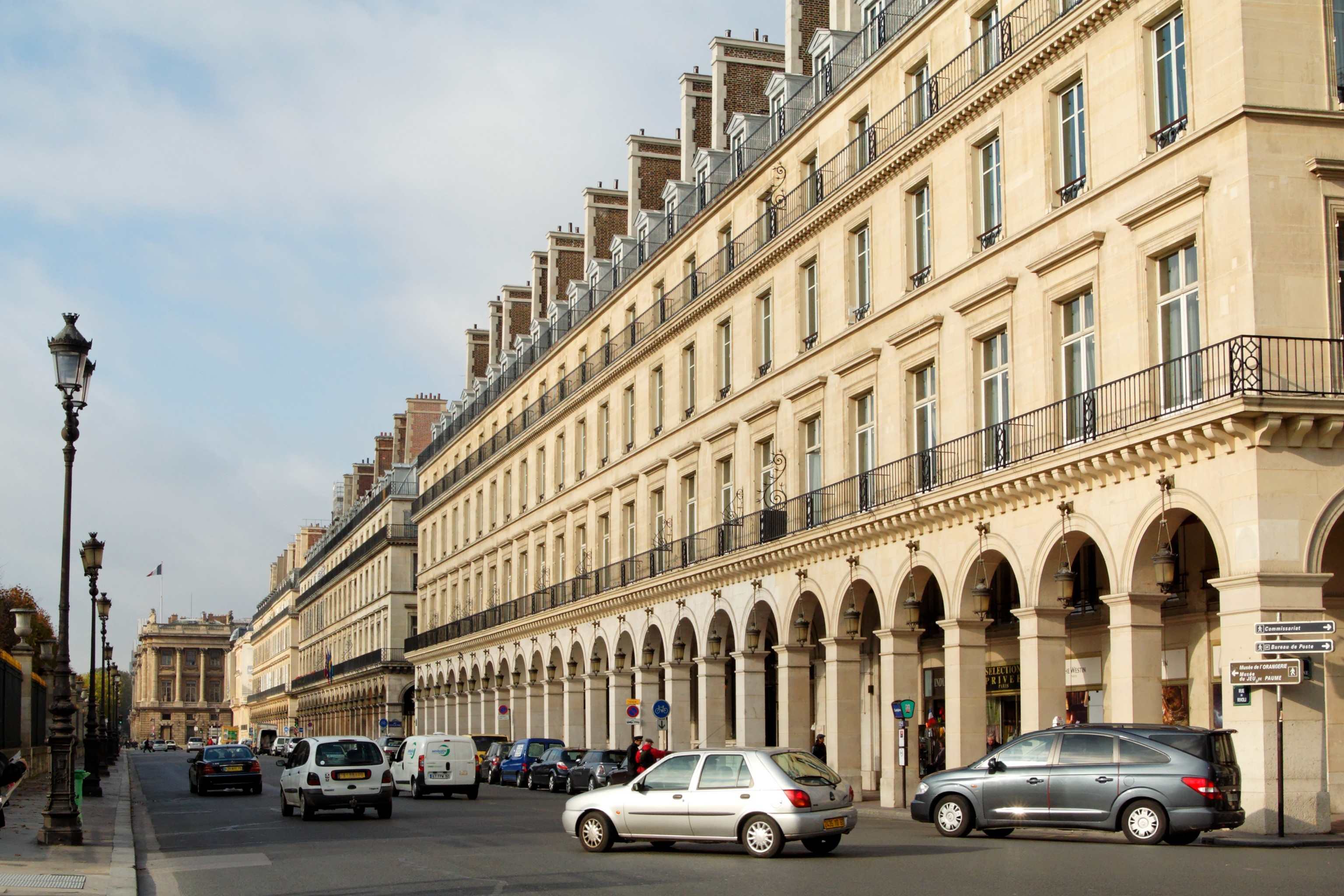
The Rue de Rivoli by Charles Percier and Pierre-Françoid-Léonard Fontaine (1801–1835)

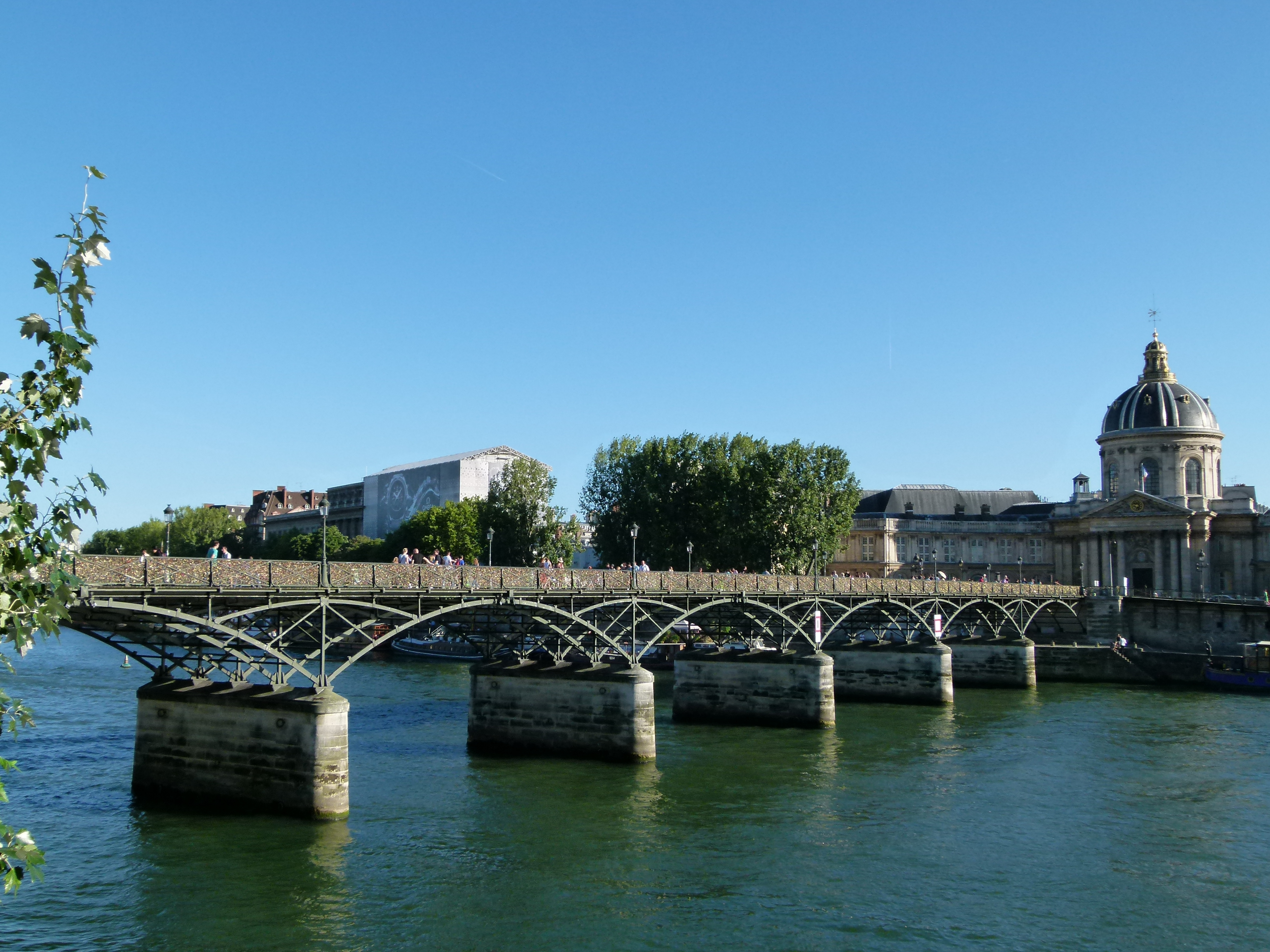
The Pont des Arts by Louis-Alexandre de Cossart and Jacques-Lacroix Dillon (1801–1803, rebuilt in 1984), the first iron bridge in Paris

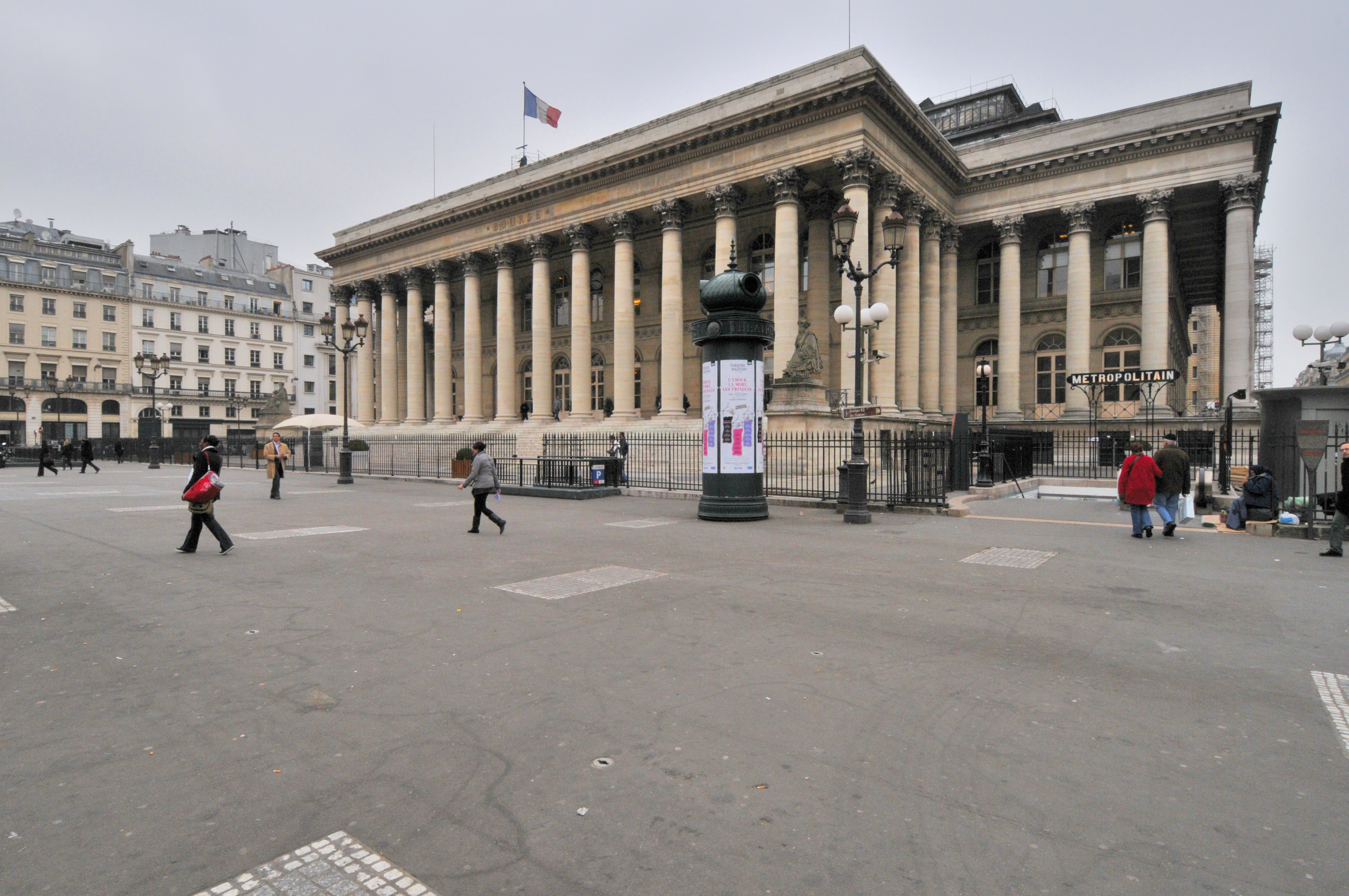
The Paris Bourse, or Paris stock exchange by Alexandre-Théodore Brongniart (1808) then Éloi Labarre and Louis-Hippolyte Lebas (1813–1826)

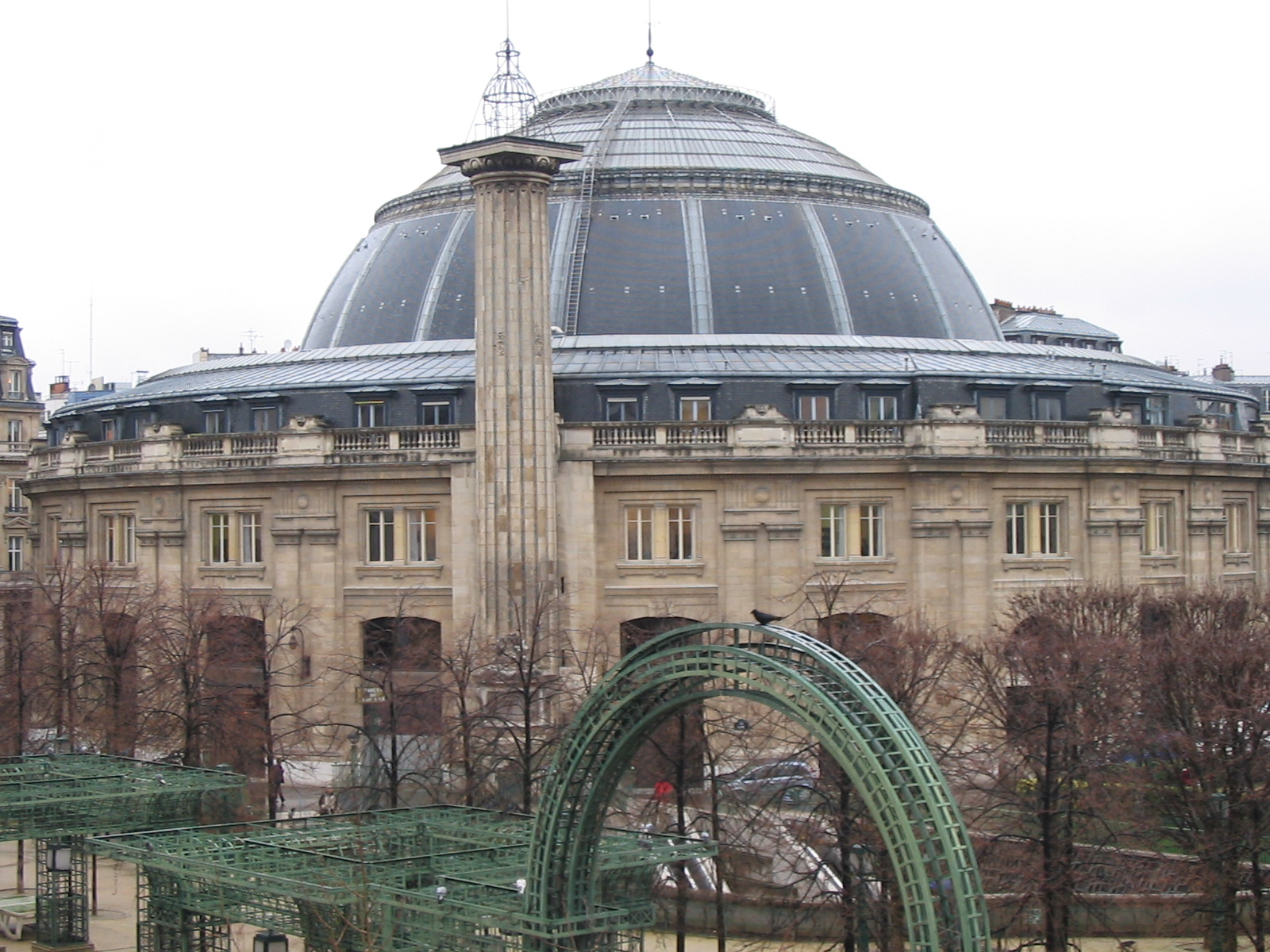
Dome of the Bourse de Commerce, the former grain market, the first Paris building with a metal frame. (1811)

=== Monuments ===
In 1806, in imitation of Ancient Rome, Napoléon ordered the construction of a series of monuments dedicated to the military glory of France. The first and largest was the Arc de Triomphe, built at the edge of the city at the Barrière d'Étoile, and not finished before July 1836. He ordered the building of the smaller Arc de Triomphe du Carrousel (1806–1808), copied from the arch of Arch of Septimius Severus and Constantine in Rome, next to the Tuileries Palace. It was crowned with a team of bronze horses he took from the façade of St Mark's Basilica in Venice. His soldiers celebrated his victories with grand parades around the Carrousel. He also commissioned the building of the Vendôme Column (1806–10), copied from the Trajan's Column in Rome, made of the iron of cannon captured from the Russians and Austrians in 1805. At the end of the Rue de la Concorde (given again its former name of Rue Royale on 27 April 1814), he took the foundations of an unfinished church, the Église de la Madeleine, which had been started in 1763, and transformed it into a 'temple à la gloire de la Grande Armée', a military shrine to display the statues of France's most famous generals.

Many of Napoleon's contributions to Paris architecture were badly needed improvements to the city's infrastructure; He started a new canal to bring drinking water to the city, rebuilt the city sewers, and began construction of the Rue de Rivoli, to permit the easier circulation of traffic between the east and west of the city. He also began construction of the Palais de la Bourse (1808–26), the Paris stock market, with its grand colonnade. it was not finished until 1826. In 1806 he began to build a new façade for the Palais Bourbon, the modern National Assembly, to match the colonnade of the Temple of Military Glory (now the Madeleine), directly facing it across the Place de La Concorde.

=== The Egyptian style ===
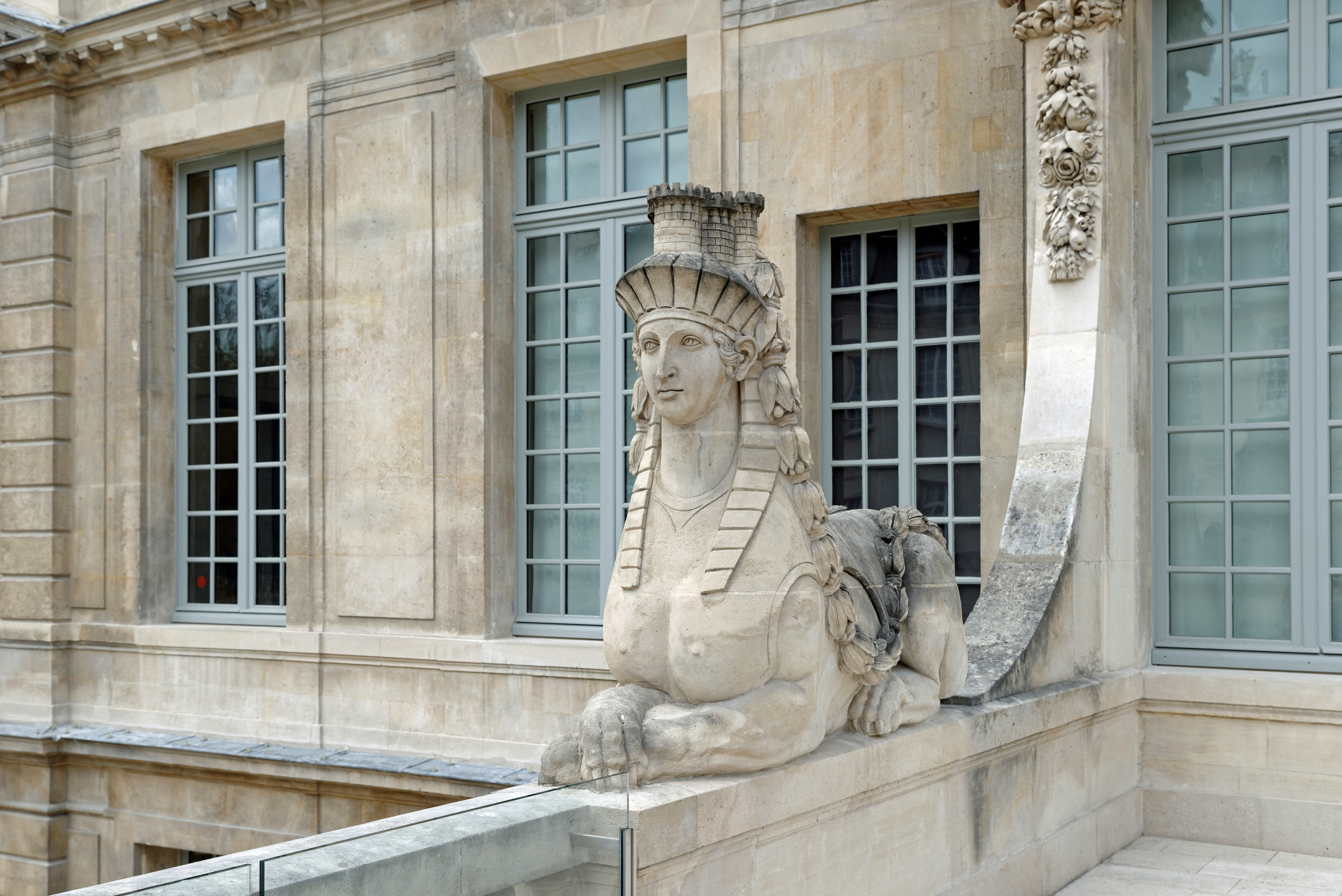
A sphinx on the balustrade of the Hotel Salé (now the Musée Picasso) (1656–59)

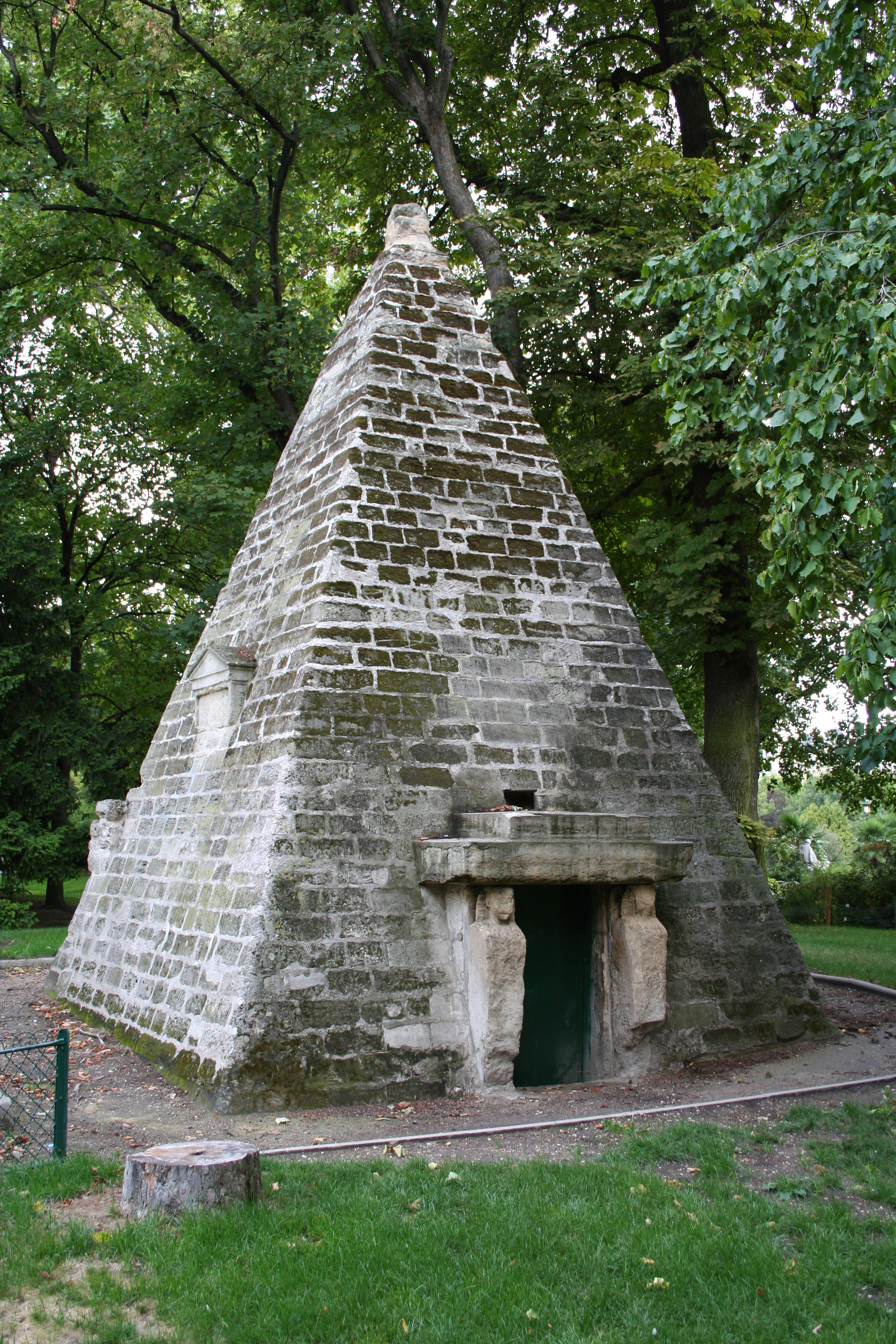
Pyramid in the gardens of Parc Monceau (1778)

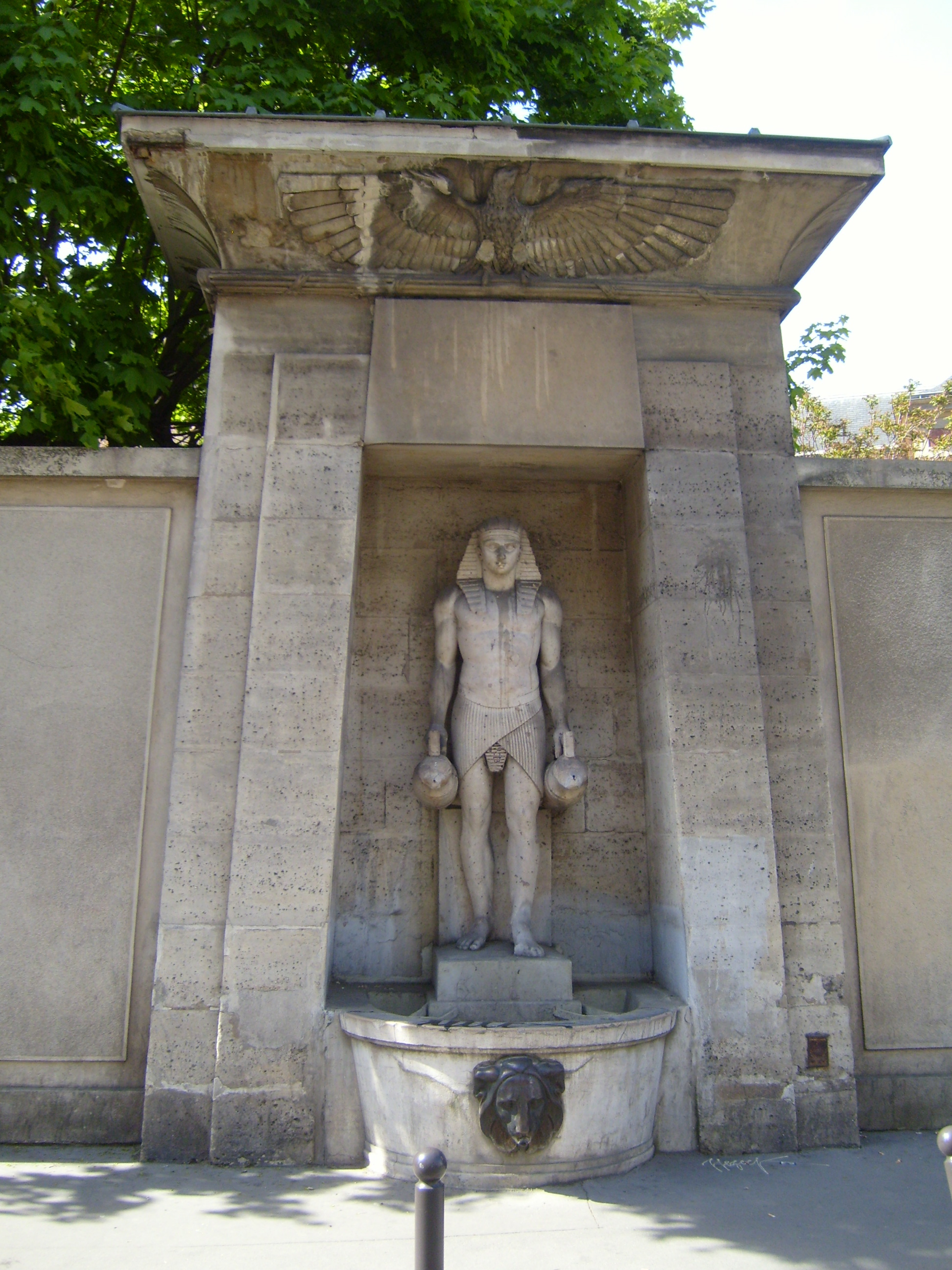
The Fontaine du Fellah at 42 rue de Sèvres by François-Jean Bralle (1807)

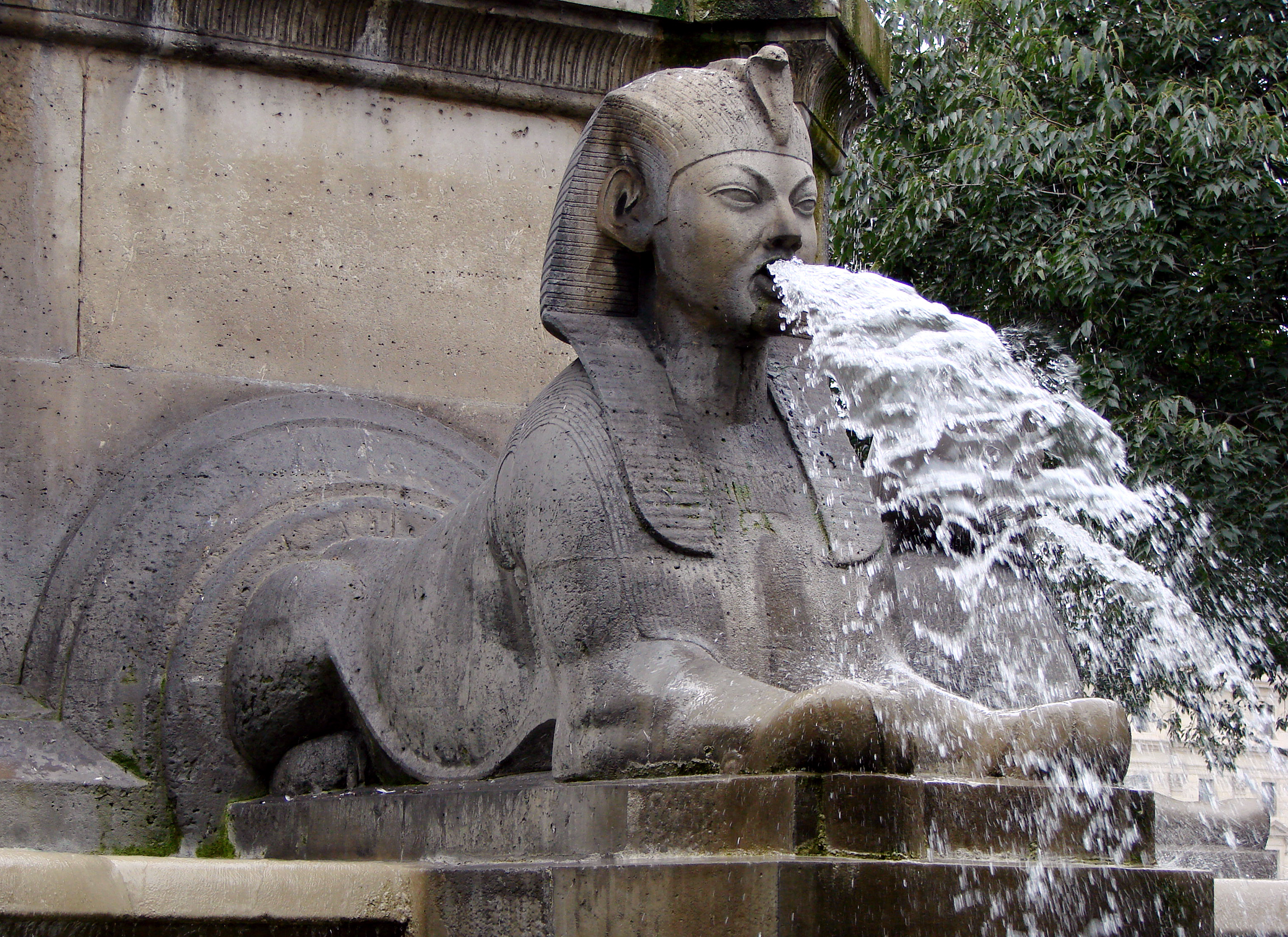
Sphinx of the Fontaine du Palmier (1808 and 1858)

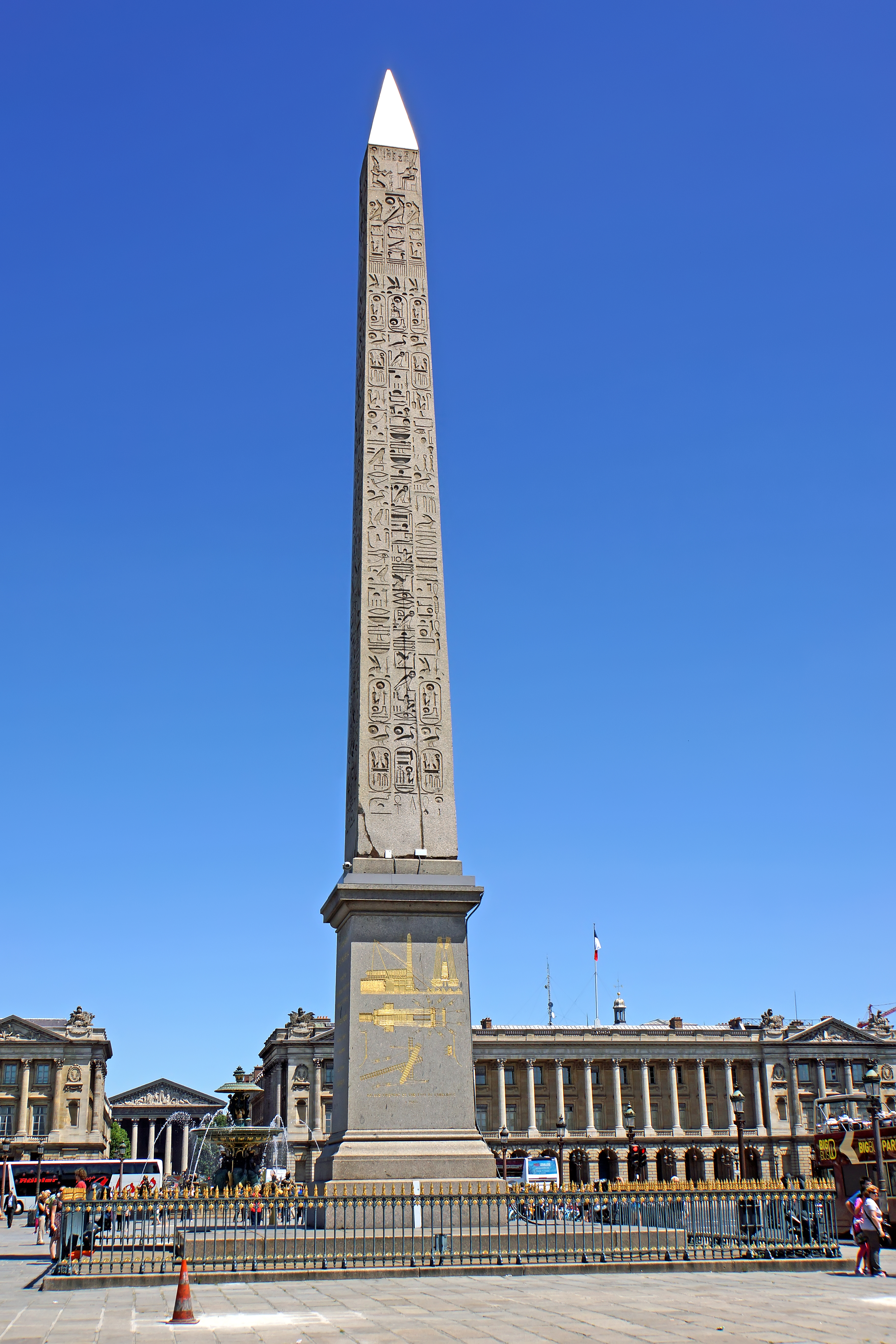
The Luxor Obelisk erected on the Place de la Concorde in 1836

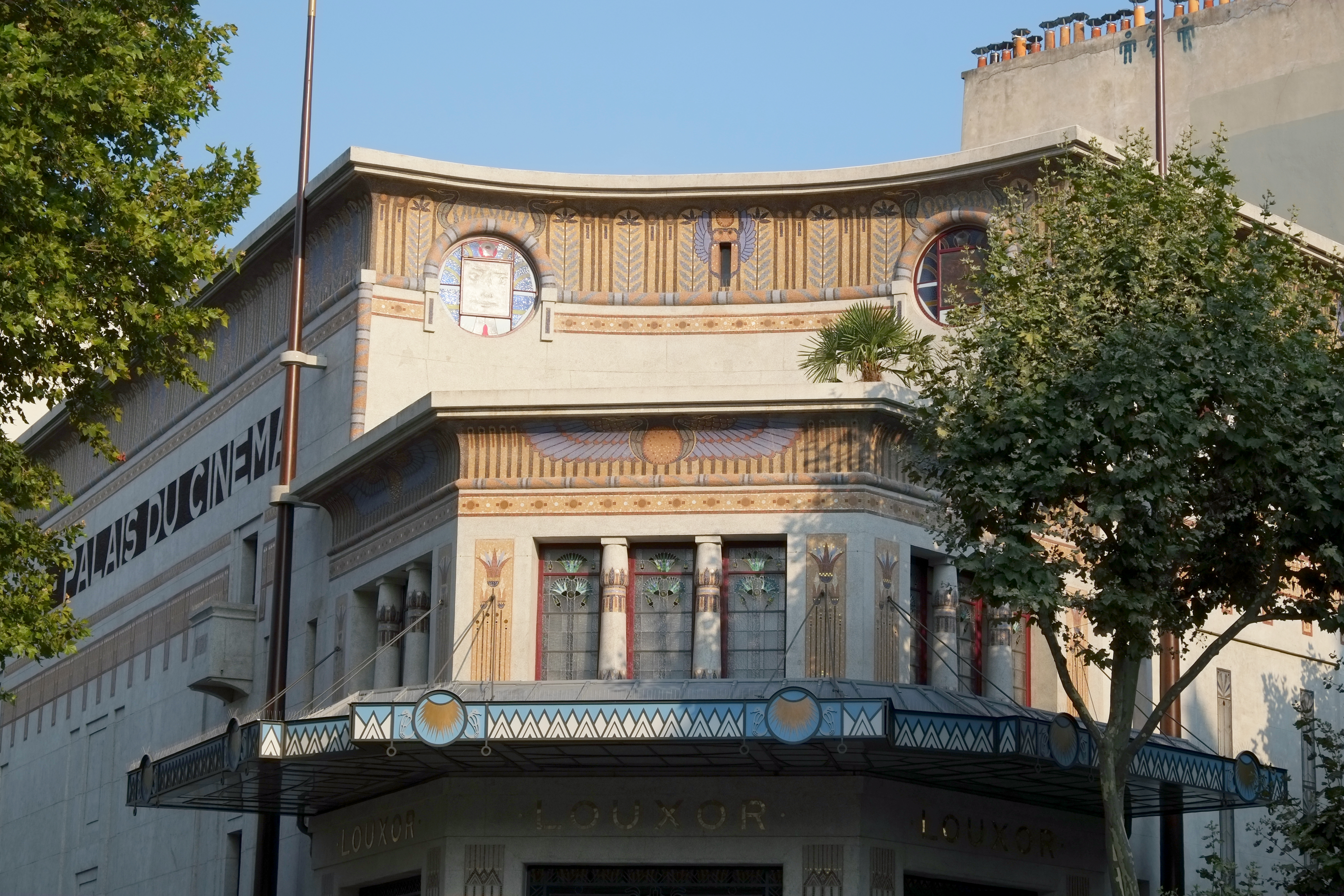
The Luxor movie palace on boulevard de Magenta (1921)

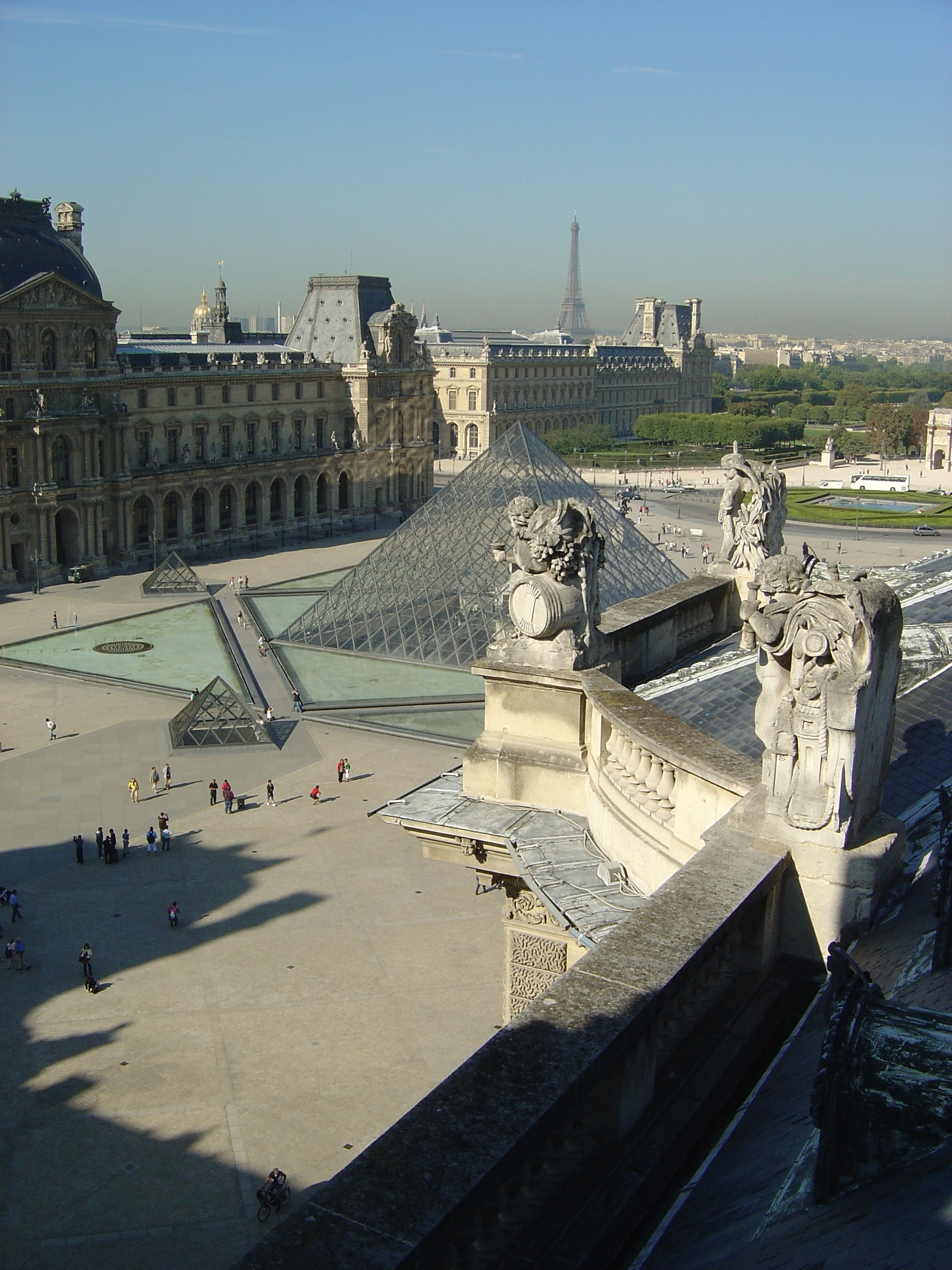
The Louvre Pyramid by I. M. Pei (1988)

Parisians had a taste for the Egyptian style long before Napoleon; pyramids, obelisks and sphinxes occurred frequently in Paris decoration, such as the decorative sphinxes decorating the balustrade of the Hotel Sale (now the Musée Picasso) (1654–1659), and small pyramids decorating the Anglo-Chinese gardens of the Château de Bagatelle and Parc Monceau in the (18th century). However, Napoleon's Egyptian campaign gave the style a new prestige, and for the first time it was based on drawings and actual models carried back the scholars who traveled with Napoleon's soldiers to Egypt; the style soon appeared in public fountains and residential architecture, including the Fontaine du Fellah on rue de Sèvres by François-Jean Bralle (1807) and the Fontaine du Palmier by Bralle and Louis Simon Boizot (1808). The sphinxes around this fountain were Second-Empire additions in 1856–58 by the city architect of Napoleon III, Gabriel Davioud. The grandest Egyptian element added to Paris was the Luxor Obelisk from the Luxor Temple, offered as a gift by the Viceroy of Egypt to Louis-Philippe, and erected on the Place de la Concorde in 1836. Examples continued to appear in the 20th century, from the Luxor movie palace on boulevard de Magenta in the 10th arrondissement (1921) to the Louvre pyramid by I. M. Pei (1988).

=== The debut of iron architecture ===
Iron architecture made its Paris debut under Napoleon, with the construction of the Pont des Arts by Louis-Alexandre de Cessart and Jacques Lacroix-Dillon (1801–03). This was followed by a metal frame for the cupola of the Halle aux blé, or grain market (now the Paris Bourse de Commerce, or Chamber of Commerce). Designed by the architect François-Joseph Bélanger and the engineer François Brunet (1811). It replaced the wooden-framed dome built by Nicolas Le Camus de Mézières in 1767, which burned in 1802. It was the first iron frame used in a Paris building.

== The Restoration (1815–1830) ==
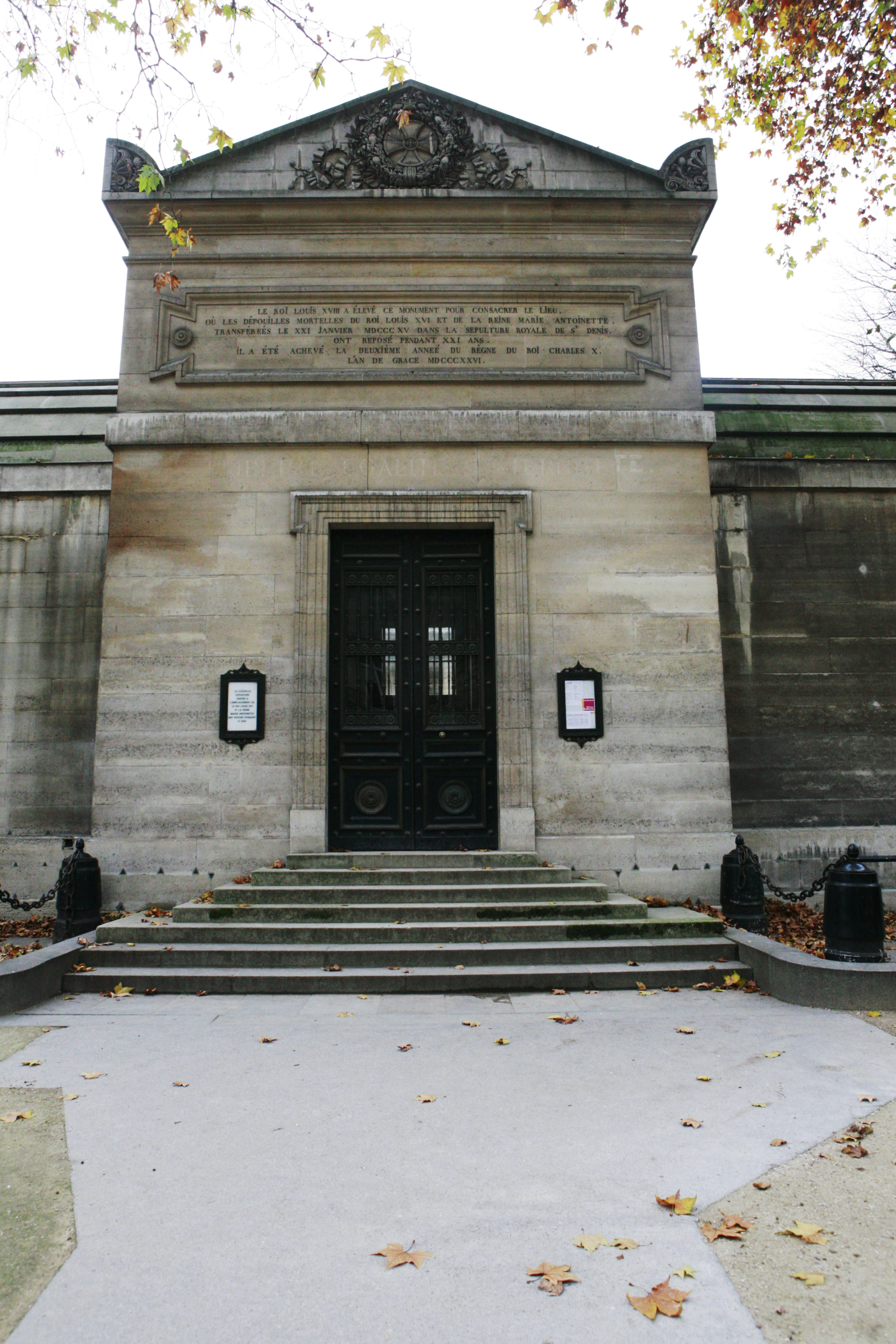
The Chapelle expiatoire by Pierre-François-Léonard Fontaine (1826)

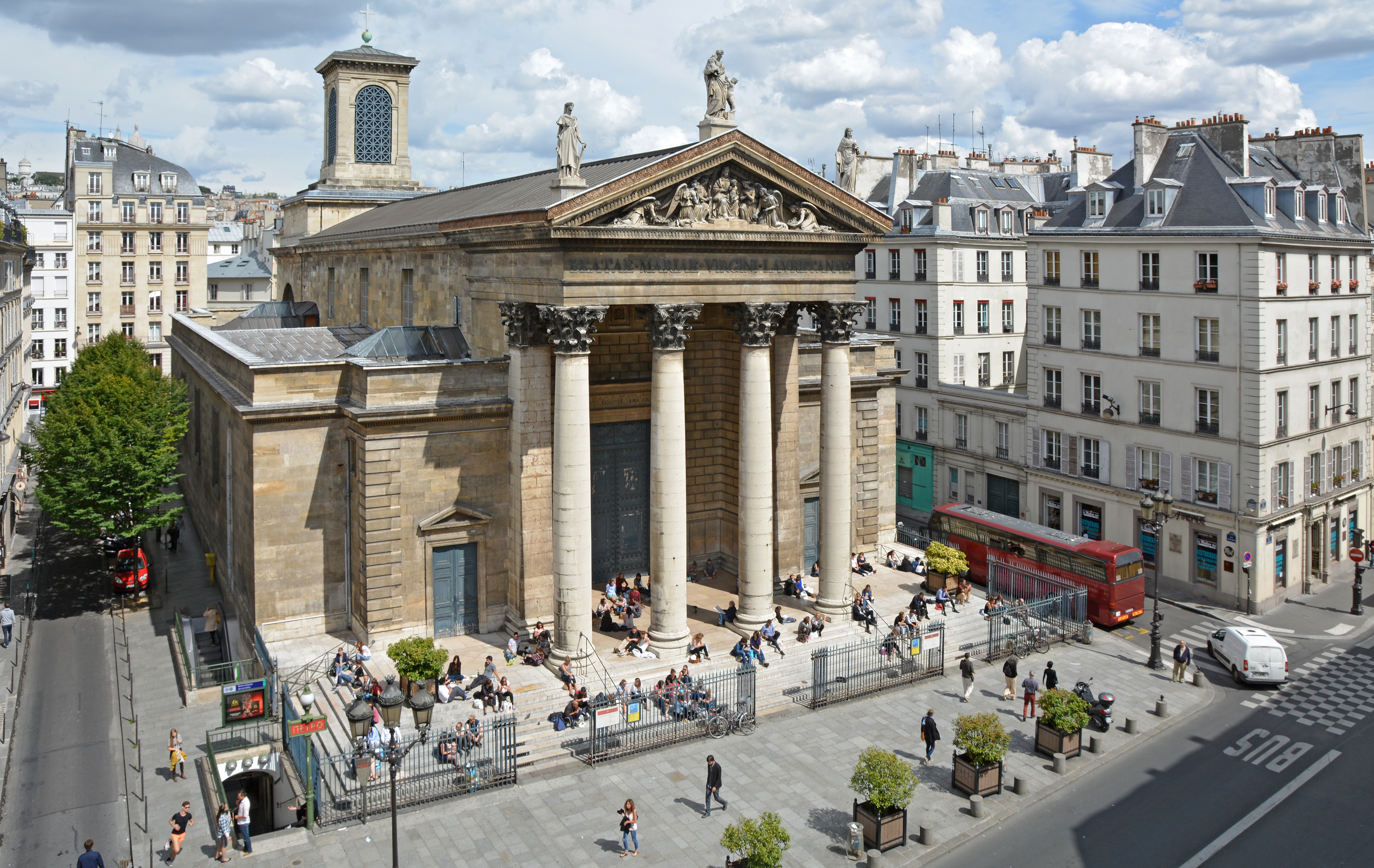
The church of Notre-Dame-de-Lorette (1823–1836) by Louis-Hippolyte Lebas;

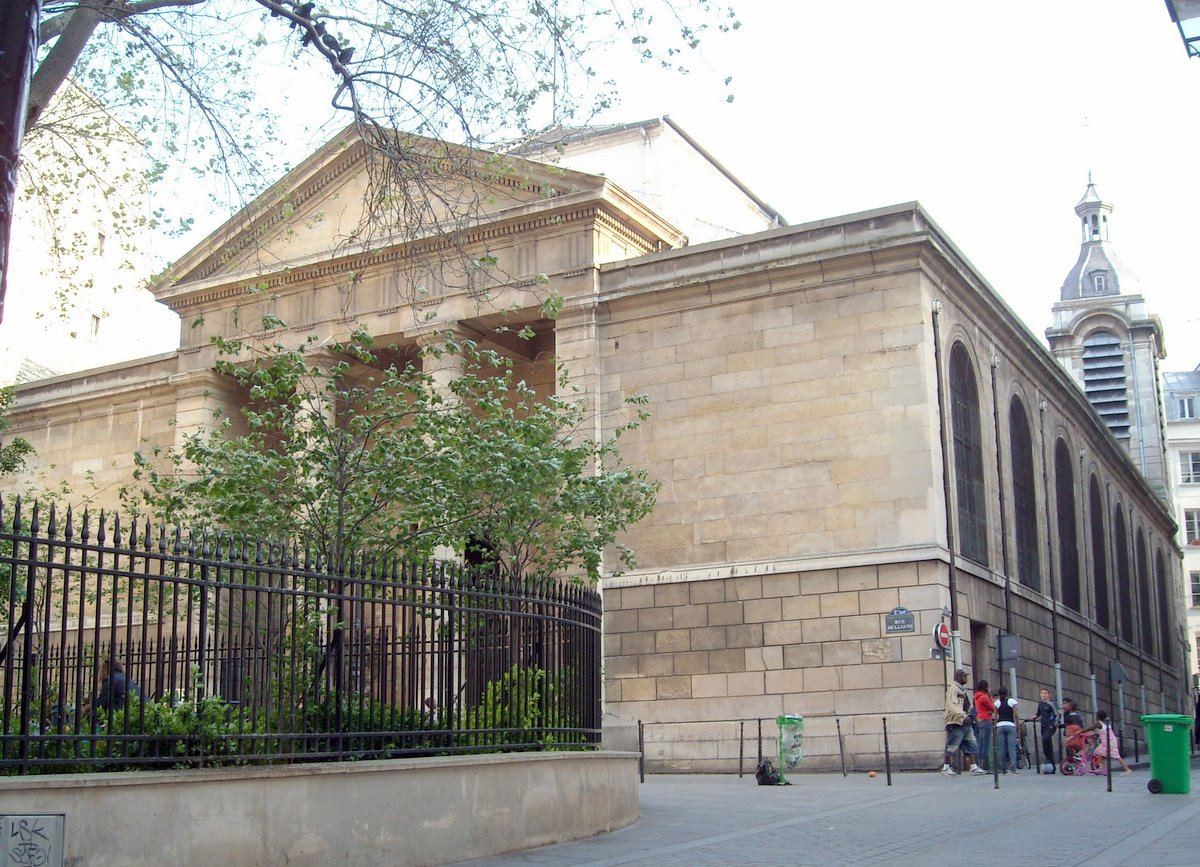
The church of Notre-Dame-de-Bonne-Nouvelle (1828–1830), by Étienne-Hippolyte Godde

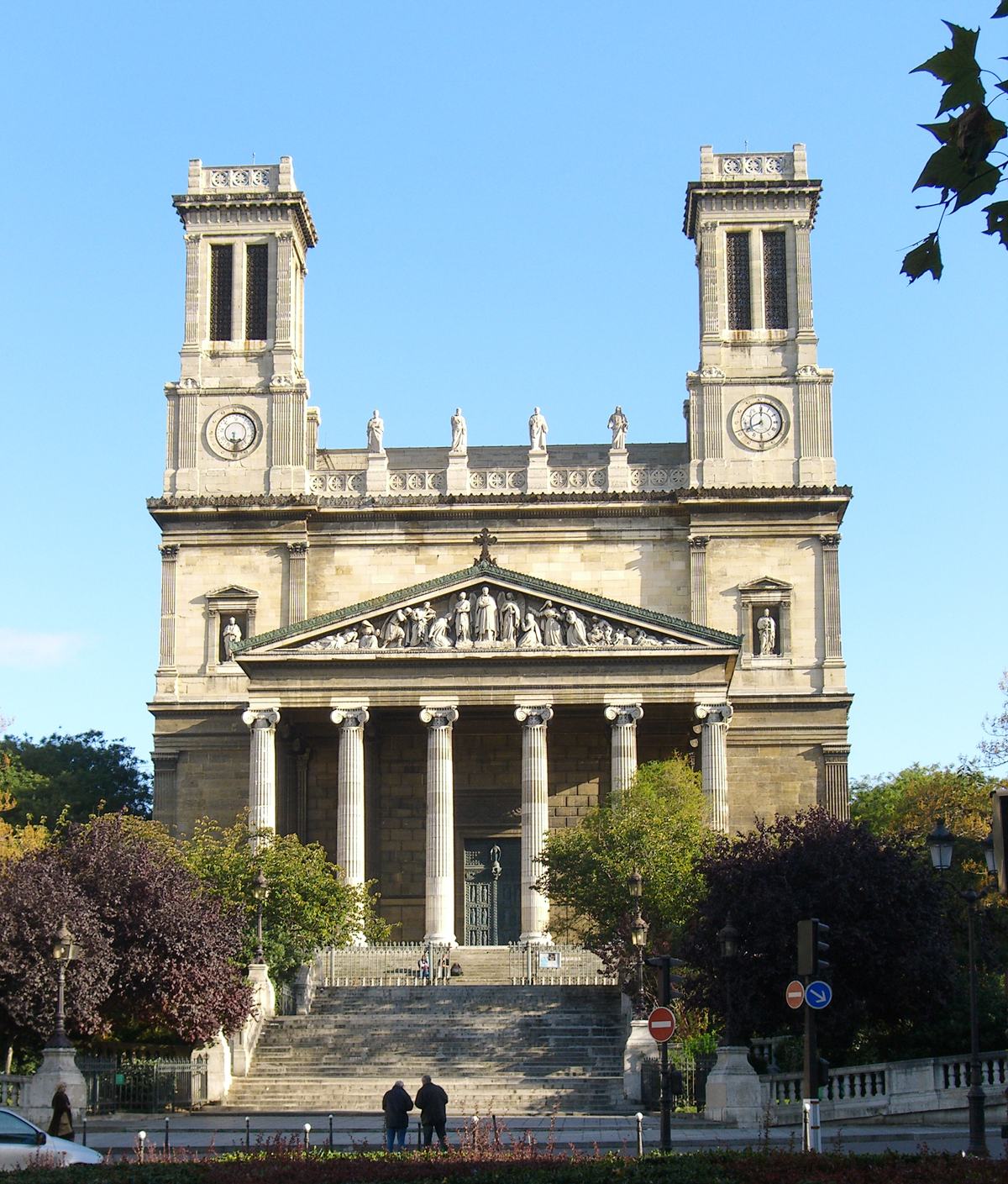
Church of Saint-Vincent-de-Paul (1824–1844) by Jacques Ignace Hittorff

=== Public buildings and monuments ===
The royal government restored the symbols of the old regime, but continued the construction of most of the monuments and urban projects begun by Napoleon. All of the public buildings and churches of the Restoration were built in a relentlessly neoclassical style. Work resumed, slowly, on the unfinished Arc de Triomphe, begun by Napoleon. At the end of the reign of Louis XVIII, the government decided to transform it from a monument to the victories of Napoleon into a monument celebrating the victory of the Duke of Angôuleme over the Spanish revolutionaries who had overthrown their Bourbon king. A new inscription was planned: "To the Army of the Pyrenees", but the inscription had not been carved and the work was still not finished when the regime was toppled in 1830.

The Canal Saint-Martin was finished in 1822, and the building of the Bourse de Paris, or stock market, designed and begun by Alexandre-Théodore Brongniart from 1808 to 1813, was modified and completed by Éloi Labarre in 1826. New storehouses for grain near the Arsenal, new slaughterhouses, and new markets were finished. Three new suspension bridges were built over the Seine: the Pont d'Archeveché, the Pont des Invalides and footbridge of the Grève. All three were rebuilt later in the century.

=== Religious architecture ===
The church of La Madeleine, begun under Louis XVI, had been turned by Napoleon into the Temple of Glory (1807). It was now turned back to its original purpose, as the Royal church of La Madeleine. To commemorate the memory of Louis XVI and Marie Antoinette to expiate the crime of their execution, King Louis XVIII built the Chapelle expiatoire designed by Pierre-François-Léonard Fontaine in a neoclassical style similar to the Paris Pantheon on the site of the small cemetery of the Madeleine, where their remains (now in the Basilica of Saint-Denis) had been hastily buried following their execution. It was completed and dedicated in 1826.

Several new churches were begun during the Restoration to replace those destroyed during the Revolution. A battle took place between architects who wanted a neogothic style, modeled after Notre-Dame, or the neoclassical style, modeled after the basilicas of ancient Rome. The battle was won by a majority of neoclassicists on the Commission of Public Buildings, who dominated until 1850. Jean Chalgrin had designed Saint-Philippe de Role before the Revolution in a neoclassical style; it was completed (1823–30) by Étienne-Hippolyte Godde. Godde also completed Chalgrin's project for Saint-Pierre-du-Gros-Caillou (1822–29), and built the neoclassic basilicas of Notre-Dame-du-Bonne Nouvelle (1823–30) and Saint-Denys-du-Saint-Sacrament (1826–35). Other notable neoclassical architects of the Restoration included Louis-Hippolyte Lebas, who built Notre-Dame-de-Lorette (1823–36); (1823–30); and Jacques Ignace Hittorff, who built the church of Church of Saint-Vincent-de-Paul (1824–44). Hittorff went on to along a brilliant career in the reigns of Louis Philippe and Napoleon III, designing the new plan of the Place de la Concorde and constructing the Gare du Nord railway station (1861–66).

=== Commercial architecture – the shopping gallery ===
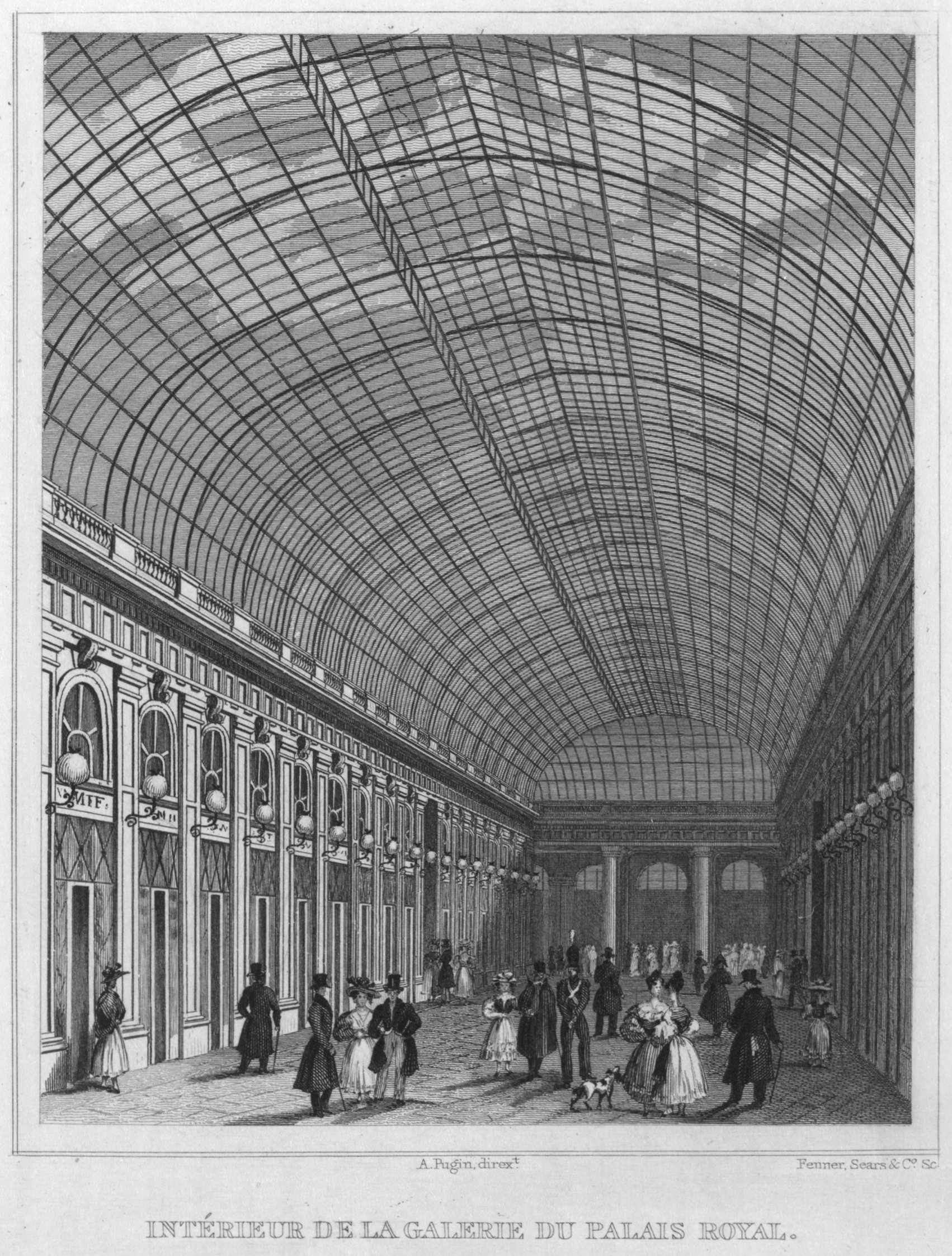
The Galerie d'Orleans at the Palais-Royal (1818–1829), a shopping arcade covered with a glass roof, by Pierre-François-Léonard Fontaine

A new form of commercial architecture had appeared at the end of the 18th century; the passage, or shopping gallery, a row of shops along a narrow street covered by a glass roof. They were made possible by improved technologies of glass and cast iron, and were popular since few Paris streets had sidewalks and pedestrians had to compete with wagons, carts, animals and crowds of people. The first indoor shopping gallery in Paris had opened at the Palais-Royal in 1786; rows of shops, along with cafes and the first restaurants, were located under the arcade around the garden. It was followed by the passage Feydau in 1790–91, the passage du Caire in 1799, and the Passage des Panoramas in 1800. In 1834 the architect Pierre-François-Léonard Fontaine carried the idea a step further, covering an entire courtyard of the Palais-Royal, the Galerie d'Orleans, with a glass skylight. The gallery remained covered until 1935. It was the ancestor of the glass skylights of the Paris department stores of the later 19th century.

=== Residential architecture ===
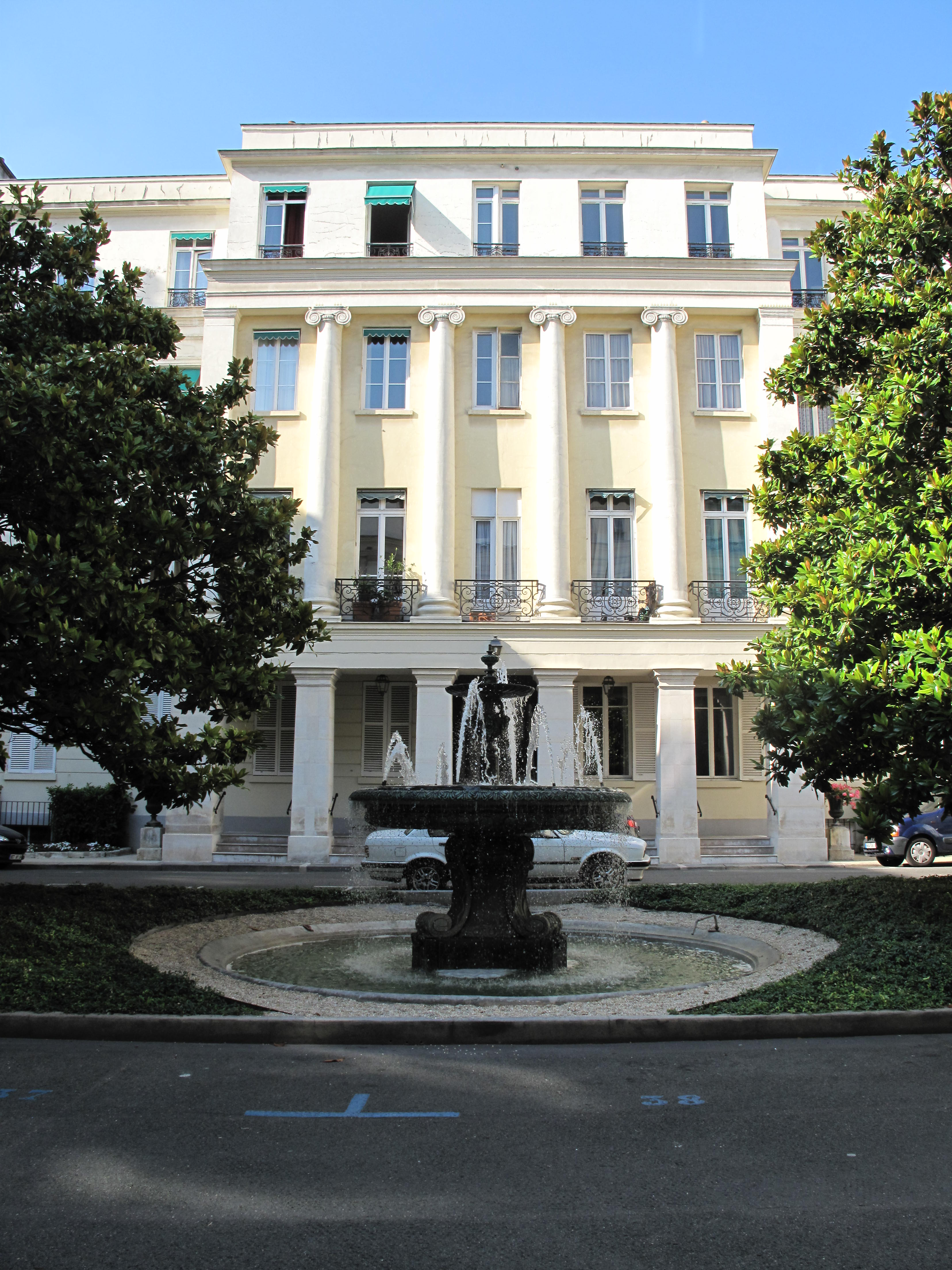
English neoclassical house in the Square d'Orleans (1829–1835) by Edward Cresy

During the Restoration, and particularly after the coronation of King Charles X in 1825. New residential neighborhoods were built on the Right Bank, as the city grew to the north and west. Between 1824 and 1826, a time of economic prosperity, the quarters of Saint-Vincent-de-Paul, Europe, Beaugrenelle and Passy were all laid out and construction began. The width of lots grew larger; from six to eight meters wide for a single house to between twelve and twenty meters for a residential building. The typical new residential building was four to five stories high, with an attic roof sloping forty-five degrees, broken by five to seven windows. The decoration was largely adapted from that of the Rue de Rivoli; horizontal rather than vertical orders, and simpler decoration. The windows were larger and occupied a larger portion of the façades. Decoration was provided by ornamental iron shutters and then wrought-iron balconies. Variations of this model were the standard on Paris boulevards until the Second Empire.

The hôtel particulier, or large private house of the Restoration, usually was built in a neoclassical style, based on Greek architecture or the style of Palladio, particularly in the new residential quarters of Nouvelle Athenes and the Square d'Orleans on Rue Taibout (9th arrondissement), a private residential square (1829–35) in the English neoclassical style designed by Edward Cresy. Residents of the square included George Sand and Frédéric Chopin. Some of the houses in the new quarters in the 8th arrondissement, particularly the quarter of François I, begun in 1822, were made in a more picturesque style, a combination of the Renaissance and classical style, called the Troubadour style. This marked the beginning of the movement away from uniform neoclassicism toward eclectic residential architecture.

== The Paris of Louis-Philippe (1830–1848) ==
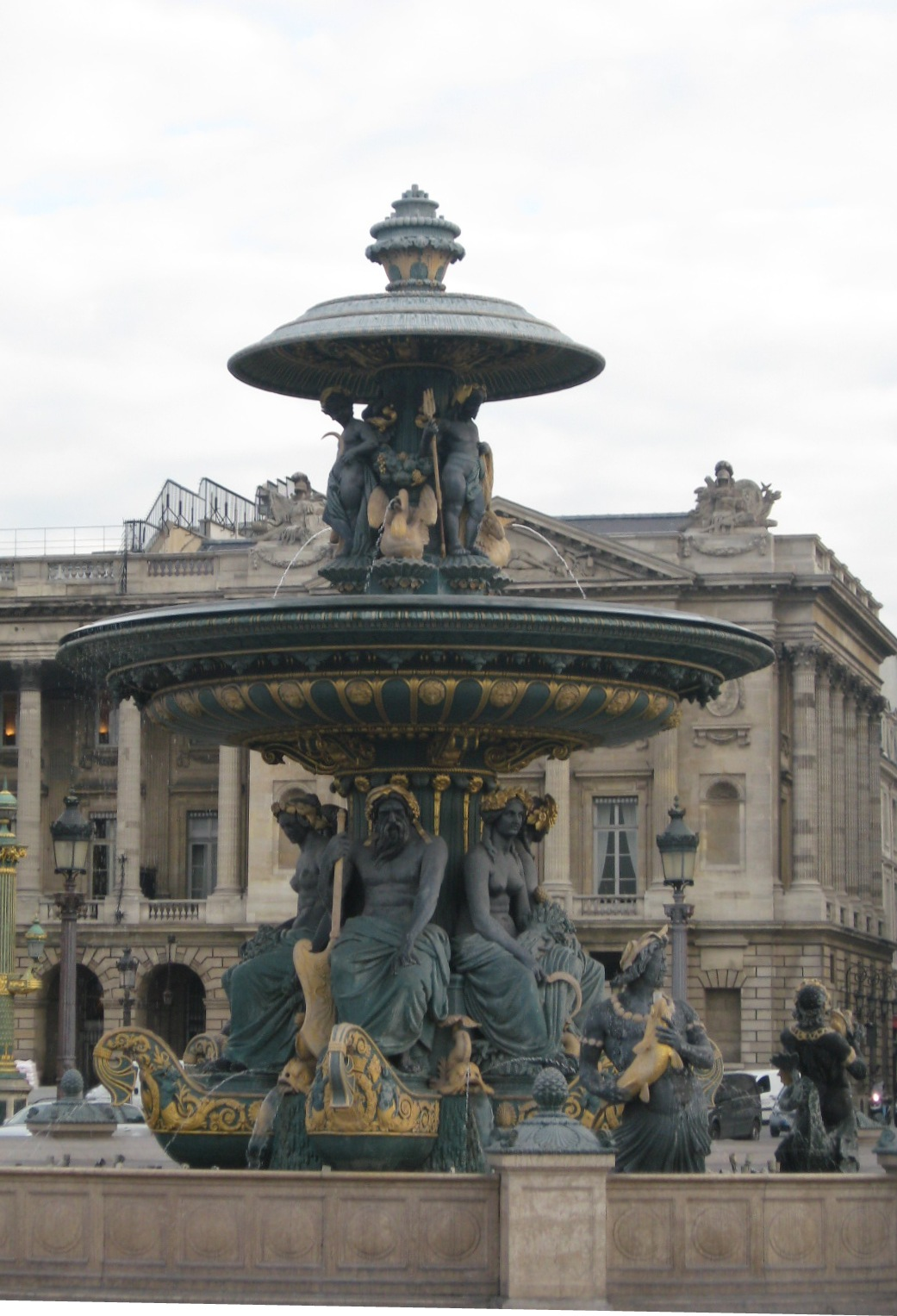
Fountain in the Place de la Concorde by Jacques Ignace Hittorff (1840)

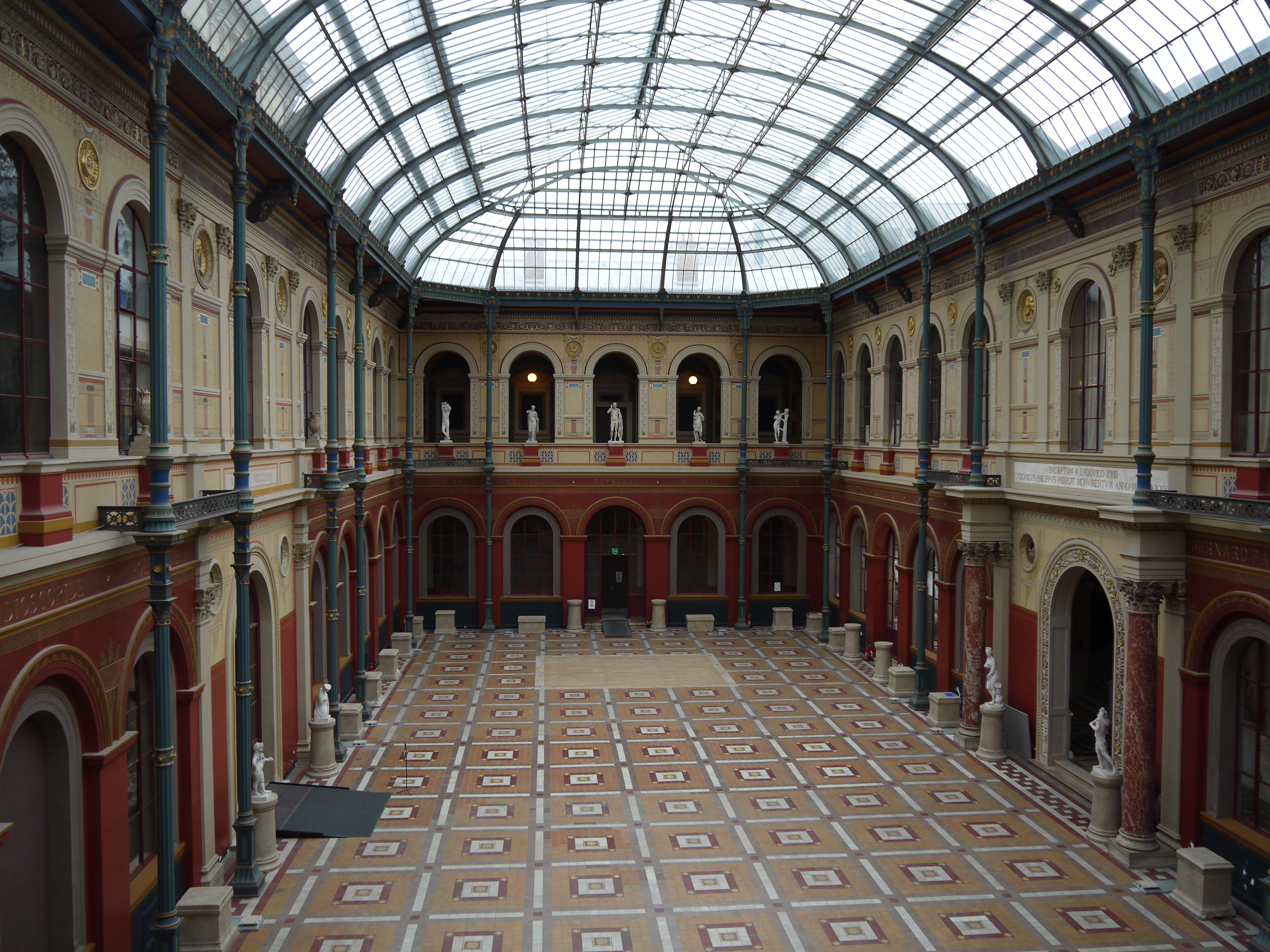
Courtyard of the École des Beaux-Arts (1832–1870) by Félix Duban

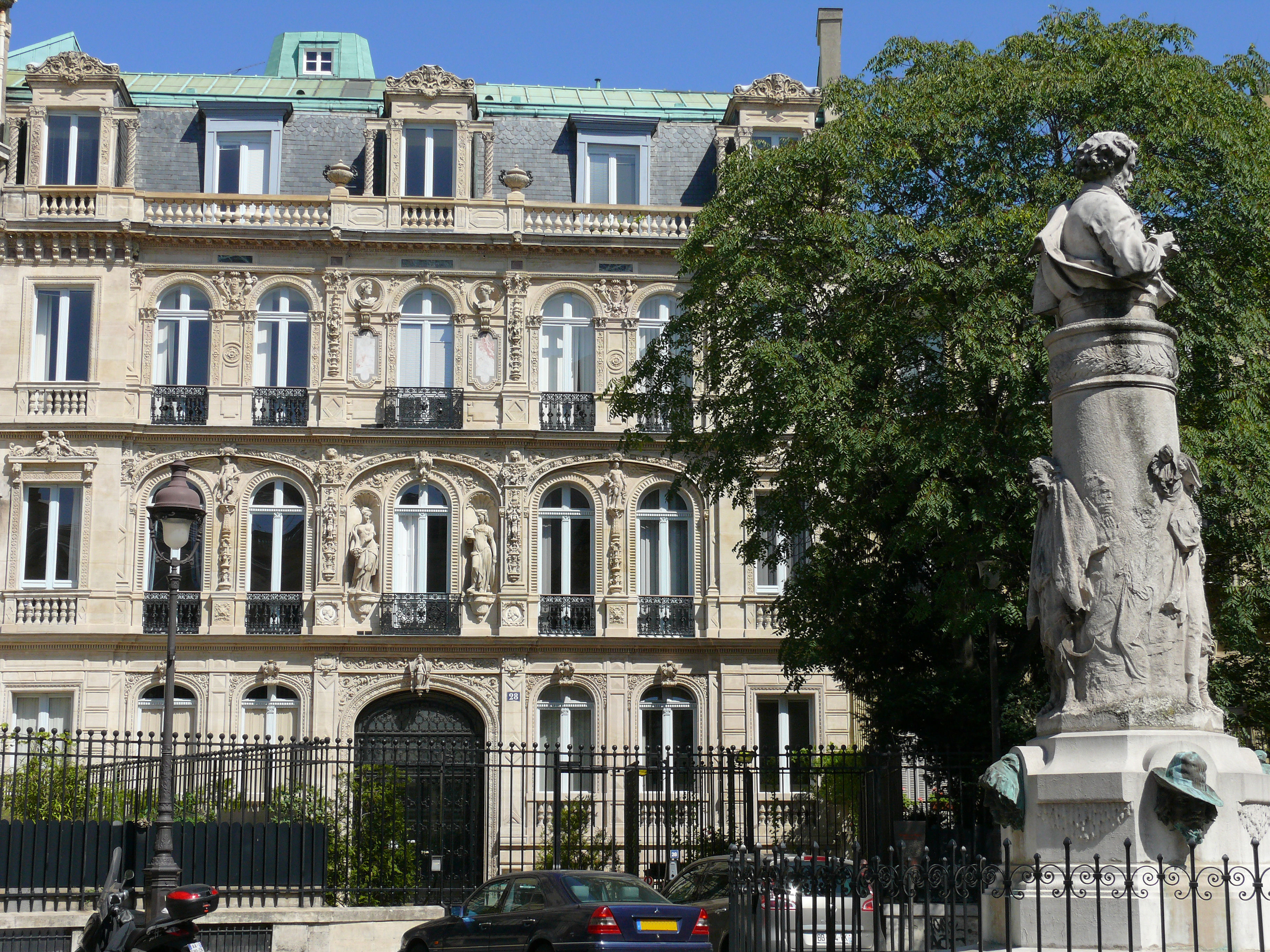
Neo-Renaissance hôtel particulier on Place Saint-Georges by Édouard Renaud (1841)

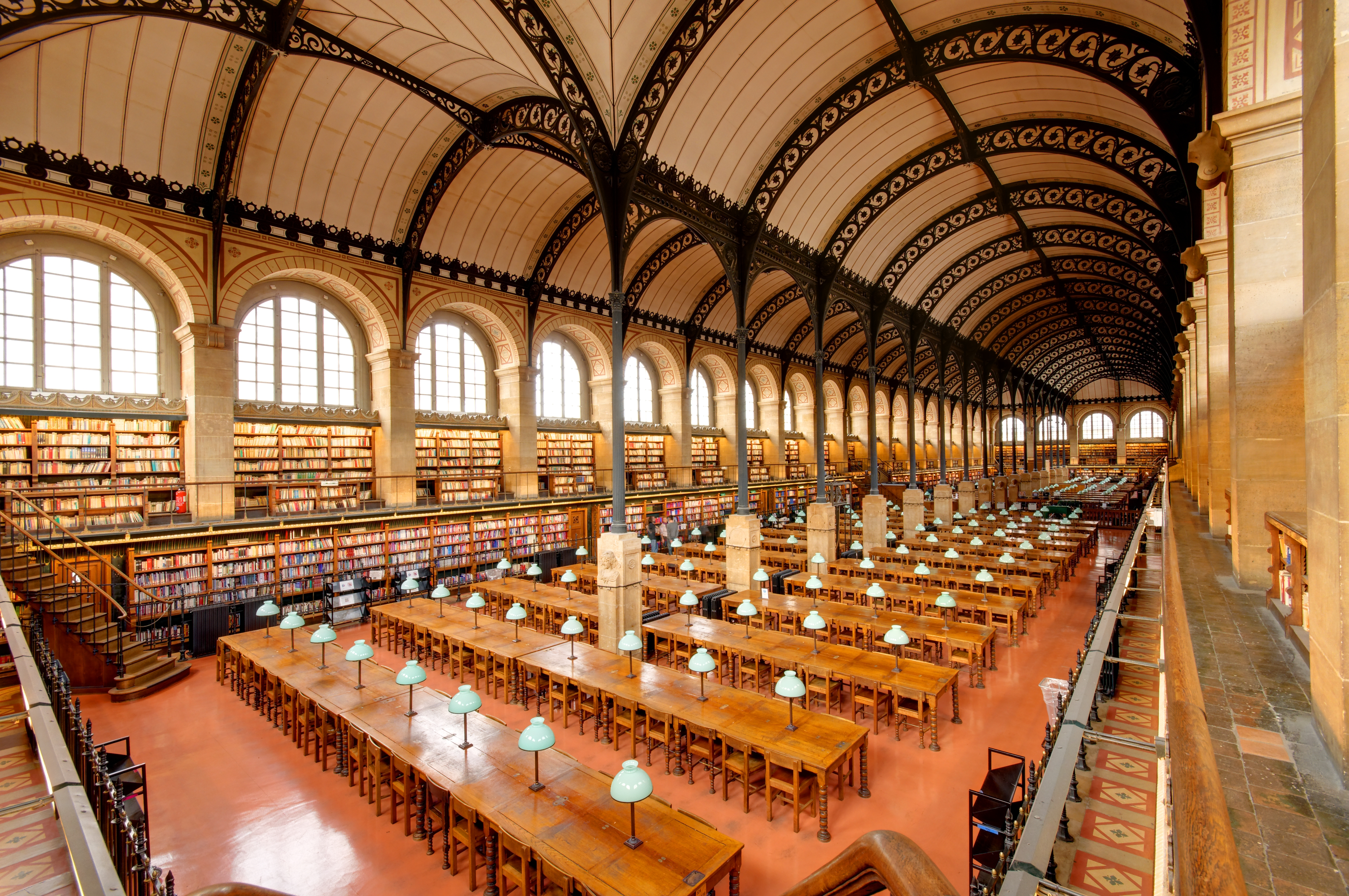
Interior of the Sainte-Geneviève Library (1844–1850) by Henri Labrouste

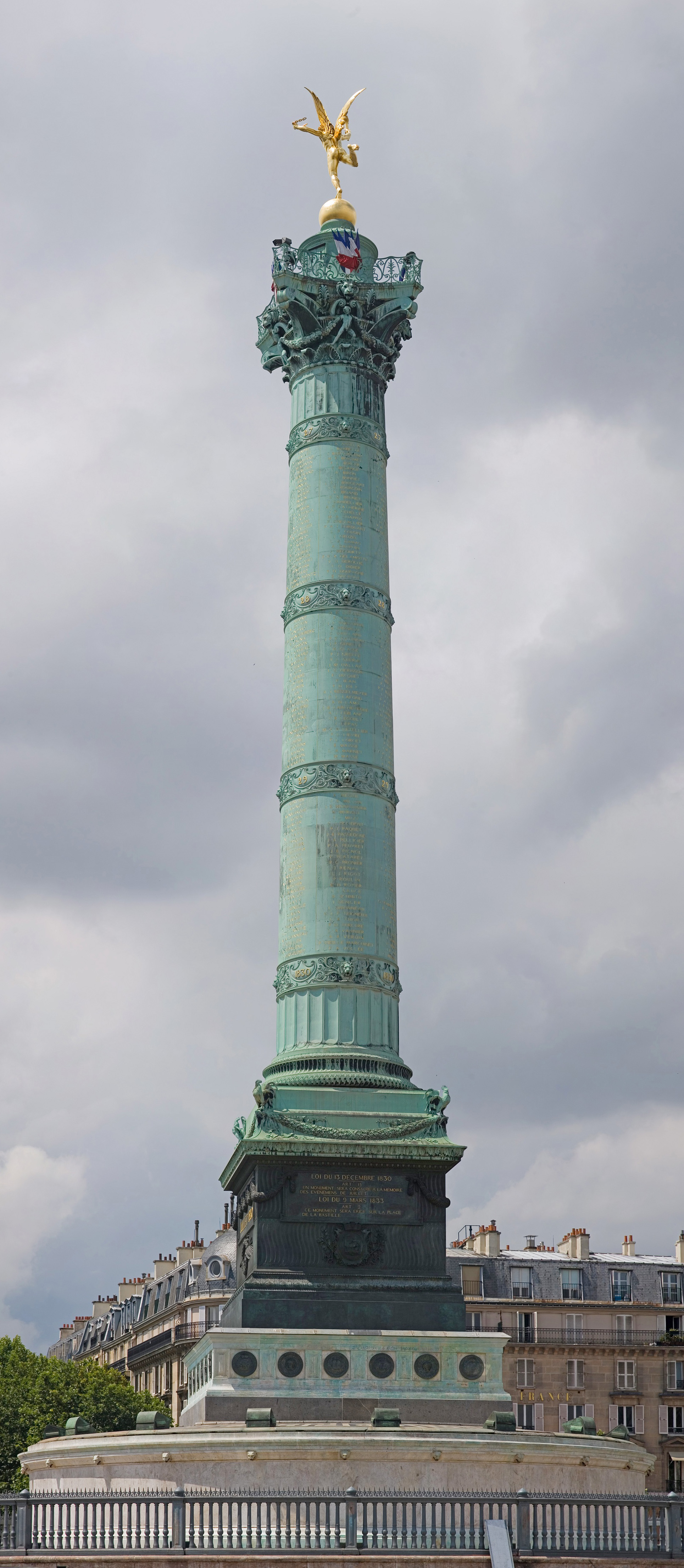
The July Column in the Place de la Bastille (1831–1840) by Joseph-Louis Duc

=== Monuments and public squares ===
The architectural style of public buildings under the Restoration and Louis Philippe I was determined by the Academie des Beaux-Arts, or Academy of Fine Arts, whose Perpetual Secretary from 1816 to 1839 was Quatremère de Quincy, a confirmed neoclassicist. The architectural style of public buildings and monuments was intended to associate Paris with the virtues and glories of ancient Greece and Rome, as it had been under Louis XIV, Napoleon and the Restoration.

The first great architectural project of the reign of Louis-Philippe was the remaking of the Place de la Concorde into its modern form. The moats of the Tuileries were filled, two large fountains, one representing the maritime commerce and industry of France, the other the river commerce and great rivers of France, designed by Jacques Ignace Hittorff, were put in place, along with monumental sculptures representing the major cities of France. On 25 October 1836, a new centerpiece was put in place; a stone obelisk from Luxor, weighing two hundred fifty tons, brought on a specially built ship from Egypt, was slowly hoisted into place in the presence of Louis-Philippe and a huge crowd. In the same year, the Arc de Triomphe, begun in 1804 by Napoleon, was finally completed and dedicated. Following the return to Paris of the ashes of Napoleon from Saint Helena in 1840, they were placed with great ceremony in a tomb designed by Louis Visconti beneath the church of Les Invalides. Another Paris landmark, the column on the Place de la Bastille, was inaugurated on 28 July 1840, on the anniversary of the July Revolution, and dedicated to those killed during the uprising.

Several older monuments were put to new purposes: the Élysée Palace was purchased by the French state and became an official residence, and under late governments the residence of the Presidents of the French Republic. The Basilica of Sainte-Geneviève, originally built as a church, then, during the Revolution, made into a mausoleum for great Frenchmen, then a church again during the Restoration, once again became the Panthéon, holding the tombs of great Frenchmen.

=== Preservation and restoration ===
The reign of Louis-Philippe saw the beginning of a movement to preserve and restore some of the earliest landmarks of Paris, inspired in large part by Victor Hugo's hugely successful novel The Hunchback of Notre-Dame (Notre-Dame de Paris), published in 1831. The leading figure of the restoration movement was Prosper Mérimée, named by Louis-Philippe as the inspector General of Historic Monuments. The Commission of Public Monument was created in 1837, and in 1842, Mérimée began compiling the first official list of classified historical monuments, now known as the Base Mérimée.

The first structure to be restored was the nave of the church of Saint-Germain-des-Prés, the oldest in the city. Work also began in 1843 on the cathedral of Notre Dame, which had been badly damaged during the Revolution, and stripped of the statues on its façade. Much of the work was directed by the architect and historian Viollet-le-Duc who, sometimes, as he admitted, was guided by his own scholarship of the "spirit" of medieval architecture, rather strict historical accuracy. The other major restorations projects were Sainte-Chapelle and the Hôtel de Ville, dating to the 17th century; the old buildings which pressed up against the back of the Hôtel de Ville were cleared away; two new wings were added, the interiors were lavishly redecorated, and the ceilings and walls of the large ceremonial salons were painted with murals by Eugène Delacroix. All the interiors were burned in 1871 by the Paris Commune.

=== The Beaux-Arts style ===
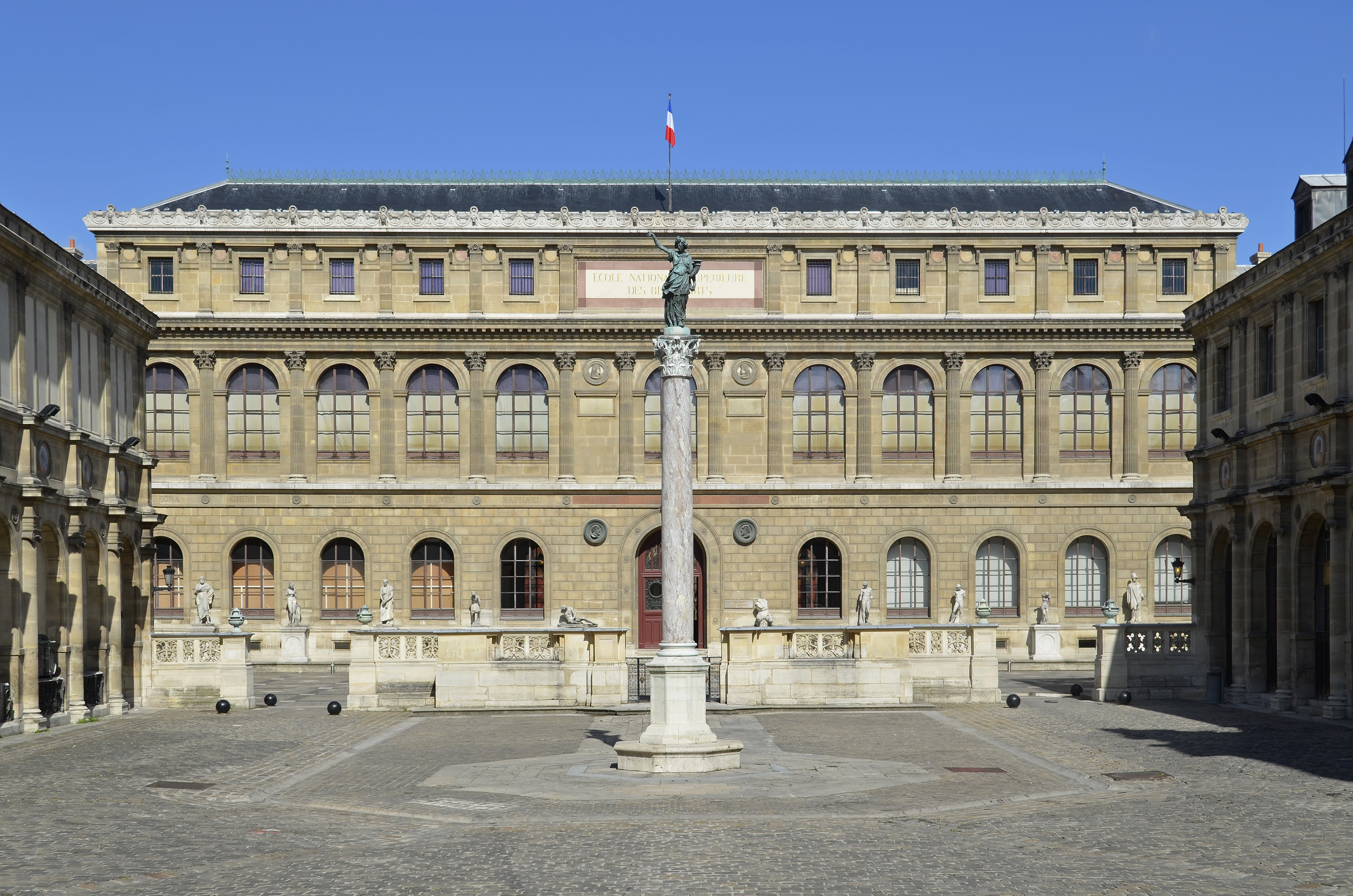
The École des Beaux-Arts by François Debret (1819–32) then Félix Duban (1832–70)

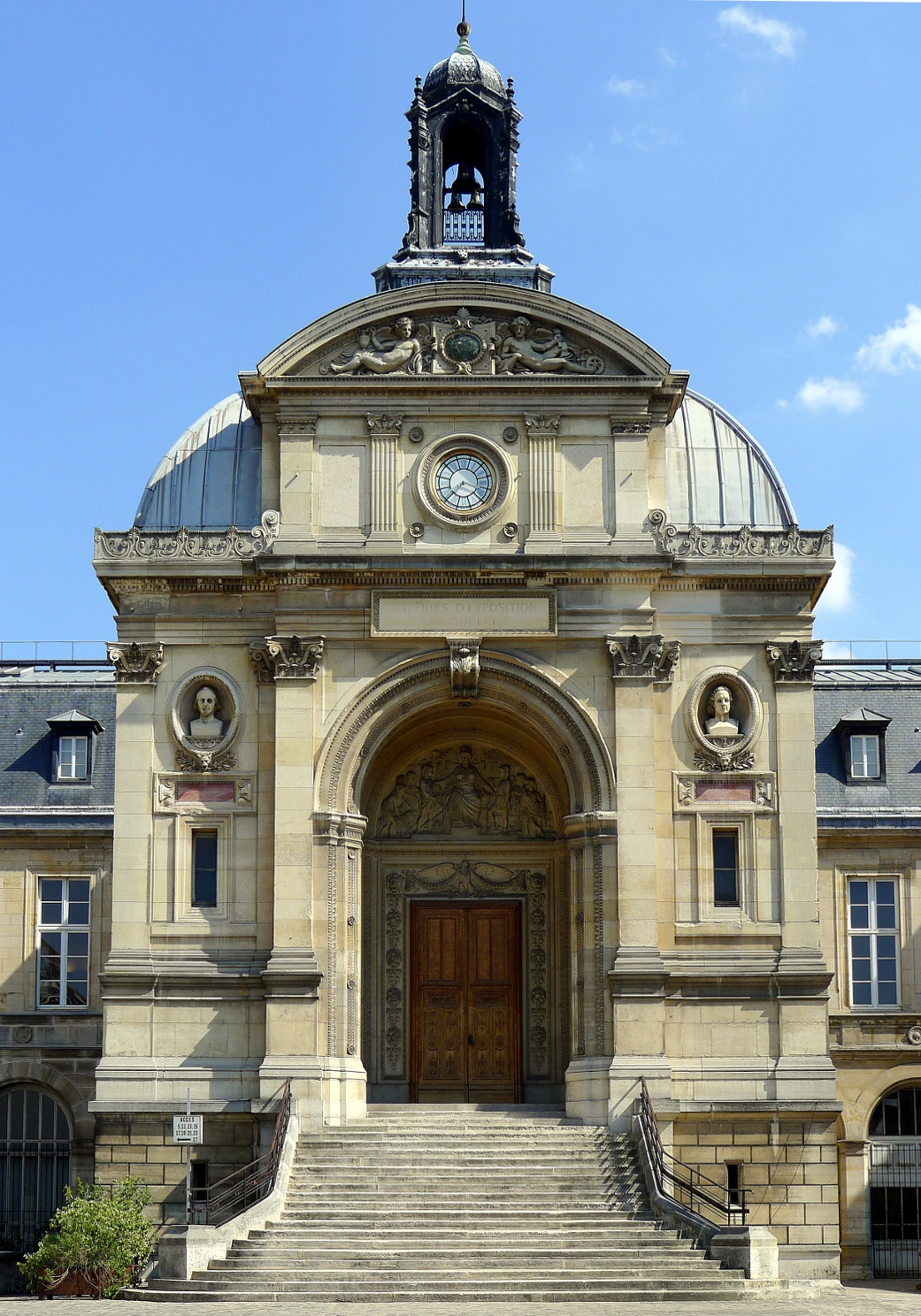
The Conservatoire national des arts et métiers by Léon Vaudoyer (1838–67)

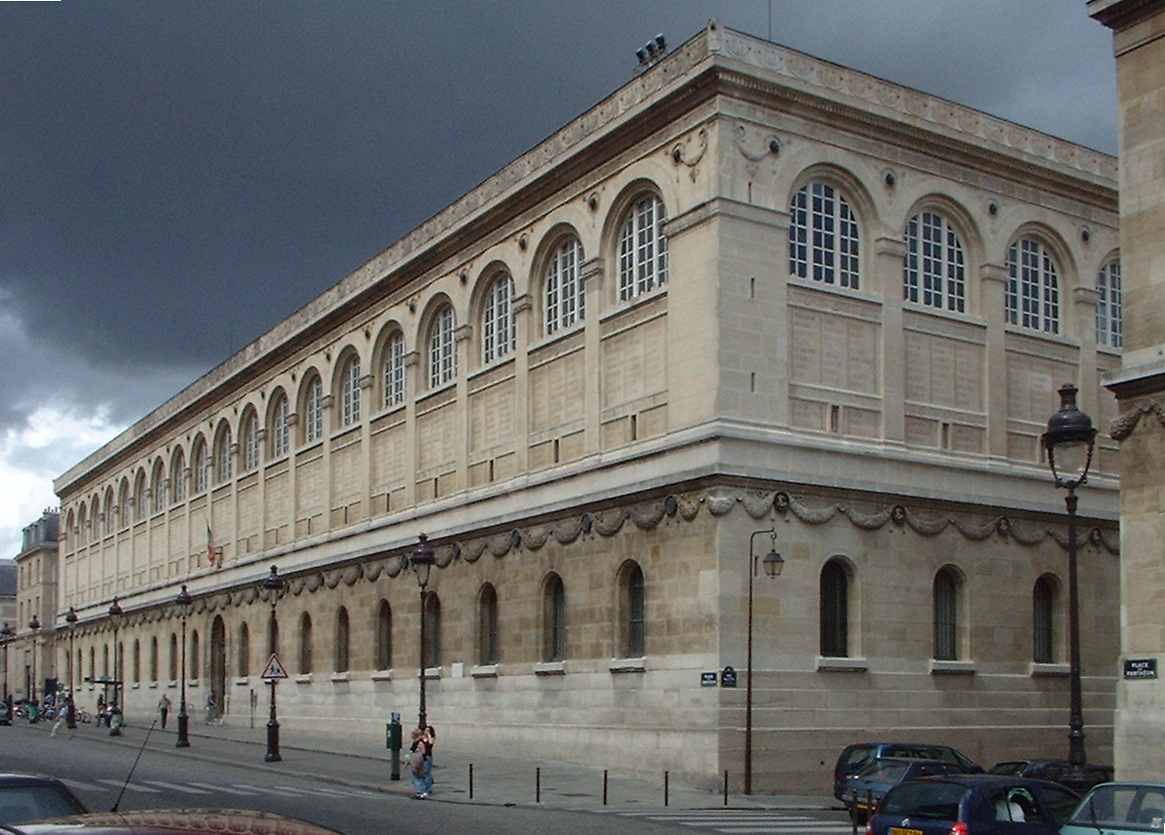
The Sainte-Geneviève Library by Henri Labrouste (1844–50)

At the same time, a small revolution was taking place at the École des Beaux-Arts, led by four young architects; Joseph-Louis Duc, Félix Duban, Henri Labrouste and Léon Vaudoyer, who had first studied Roman and Greek architecture at the Villa Medici in Rome, then in the 1820s began the systematic study of other historic architectural styles, including French architecture of the Middle Ages and Renaissance. They instituted teaching about a variety of architectural styles at the École des Beaux-Arts, and installed fragments of Renaissance and Medieval buildings in the courtyard of the school so students could draw and copy them. Each of them also designed new non-classical buildings in Paris inspired by a variety of different historic styles; Labrouste built the Sainte-Geneviève Library (1844–50); Duc designed the new Palais de Justice and Court of Cassation on the Île-de-la-Cité (1852–68); and Vaudroyer designed the Conservatoire national des arts et métiers (1838–67), and Duban designed the new buildings of the École des Beaux-Arts. Together, these buildings, drawing upon Renaissance, Gothic and romanesque and other non-classical styles, broke the monopoly of neoclassical architecture in Paris.

=== The first train stations ===
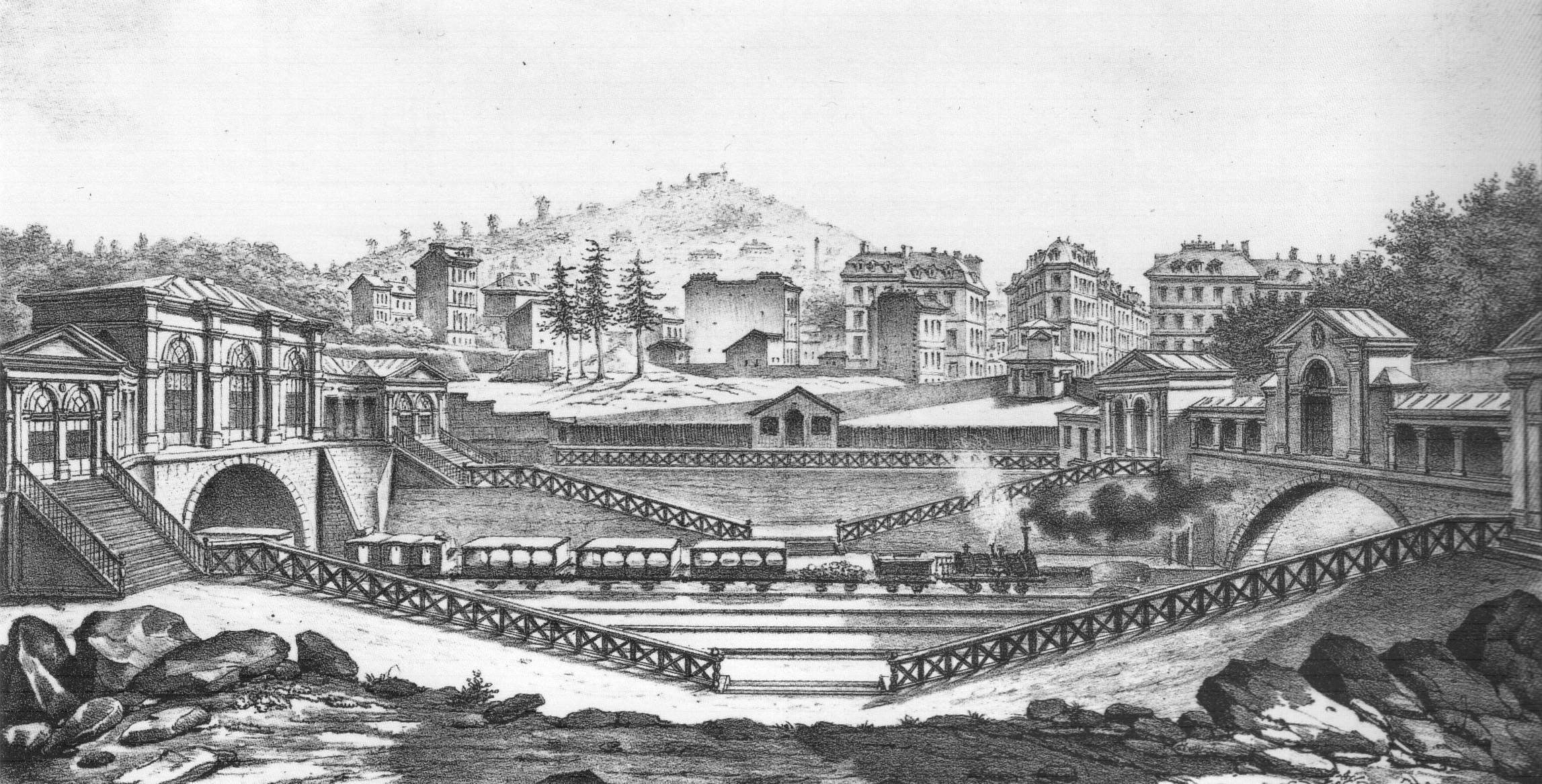
The first Paris train station, on the site of the modern Gare Saint-Lazare (1837)

The first train stations in Paris were called embarcadère (a term used for water traffic), and their location was a source of great contention, as each railroad line was owned by a different company, and each went in a different direction. The first embarcadère was built by the Péreire brothers for the line Paris-Saint-Germain-en-Laye, at the Place de l'Europe. It opened on 26 August 1837, and with its success was quickly replaced by a larger building on rue de Stockholm, and then an even larger structure, the beginning of the Gare Saint-Lazare, built between 1841 and 1843. It was the station for the trains to Saint-Germain-en-Laye, Versailles and Rouen.

The Péreire brothers argued that Gare Saint-Lazare should be the unique station of Paris, but the owners of the other lines each insisted on having their own station. The first Gare d'Orléans, now known as the Gare d'Austerlitz, was opened on 2 May 1843, and was greatly expanded in 1848 and 1852. The first Gare Montparnasse opened on 10 September 1840 on avenue du Maine, and was the terminus of the new Paris-Versailles line on the left bank of the Seine. It was quickly found to be too small, and was rebuilt between 1848 and 1852 at the junction of rue de Rennes and boulevard du Montparnasse, its present location.

The banker James Mayer de Rothschild received the permission of the government to build the first railroad line from Paris to the Belgian border in 1845, with branch lines to Calais and Dunkerque. The first embarcadère of the new line opened on rue de Dunkerque in 1846. It was replaced by a much grander station, Gare du Nord, in 1854. The first station of the line to eastern France, the Gare de l'Est was begun in 1847, but not finished until 1852. Construction of a new station for the line to the south, from Paris to Montereau-Fault-Yonne began in 1847 and was finished in 1852. In 1855 it was replaced by a new station, the first Gare de Lyon, on the same site.

== Napoleon III and the Second Empire style (1848–1870) ==
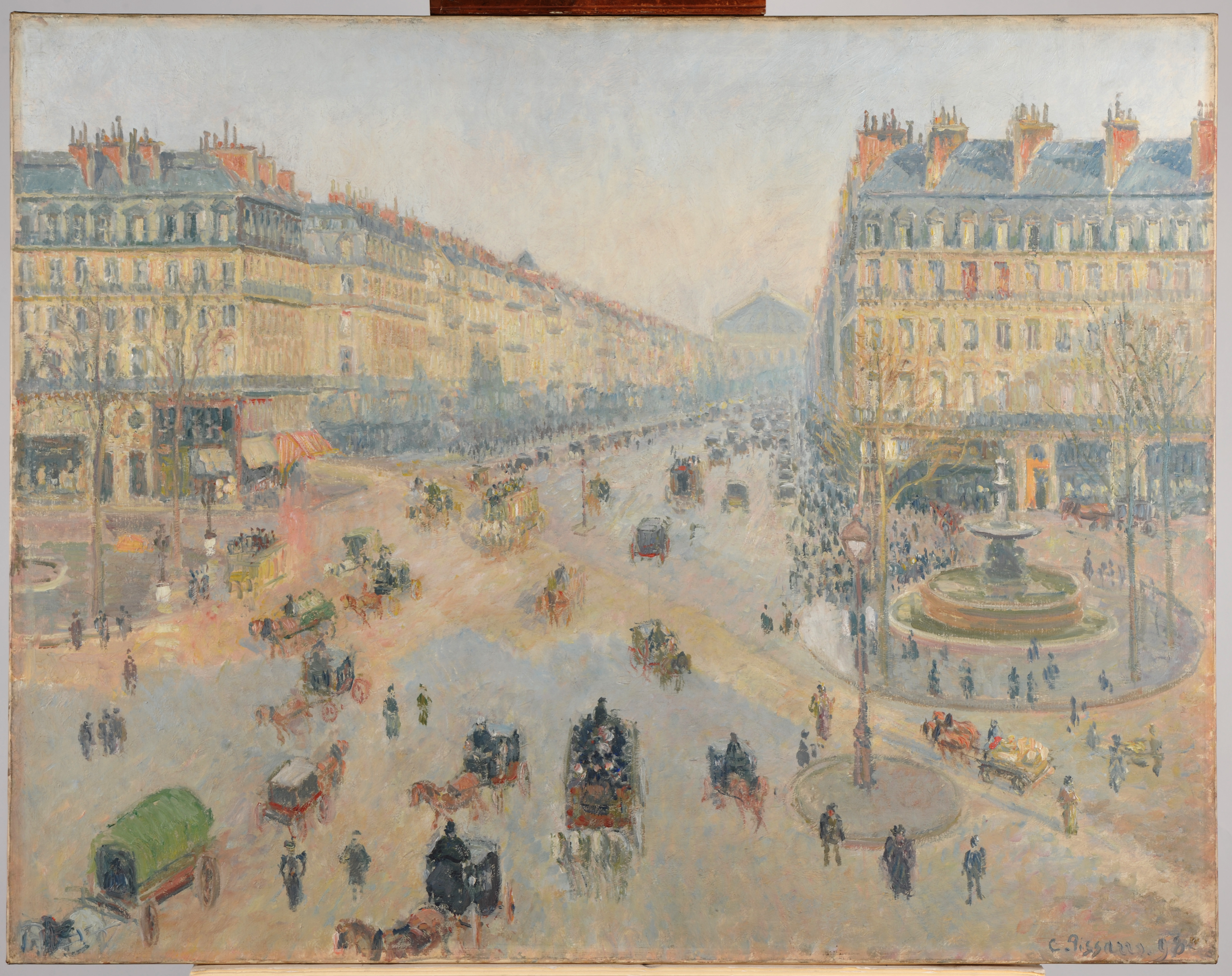
The avenue de l'Opéra painted by Camille Pissarro (1898).

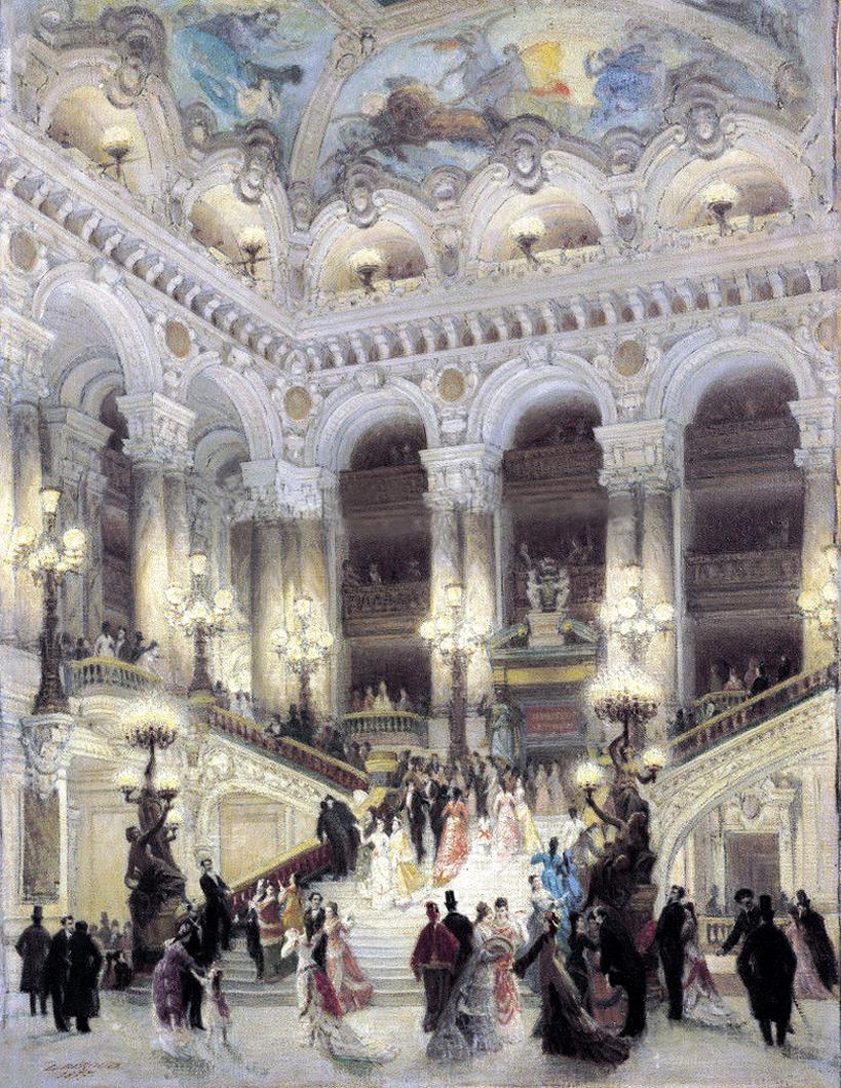
The grand stairway of the Paris Opera, designed by Charles Garnier, was begun in 1864 but not finished until 1875.

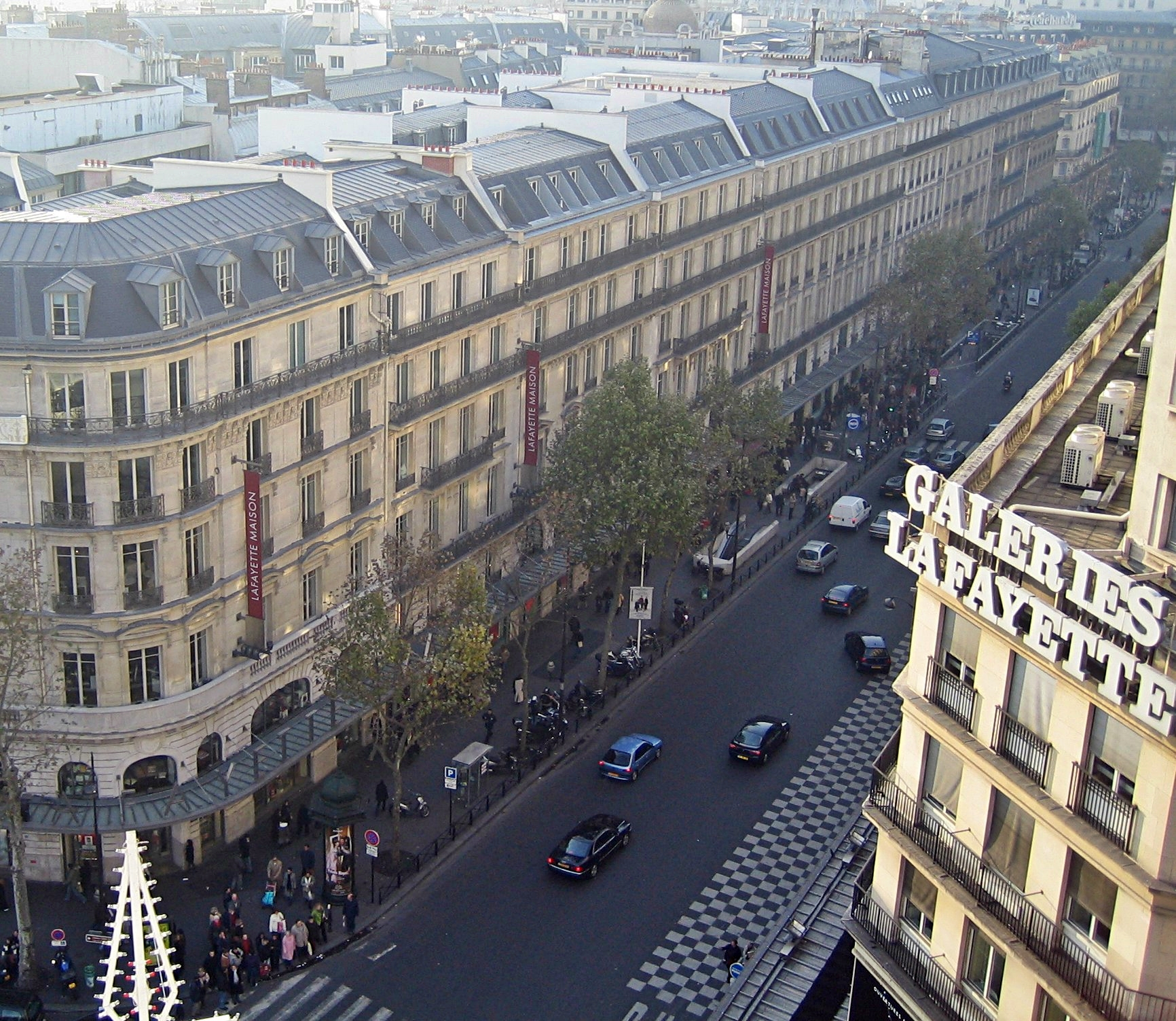
Boulevard Haussmann, with the classic Haussmann-style apartment buildings (1870)

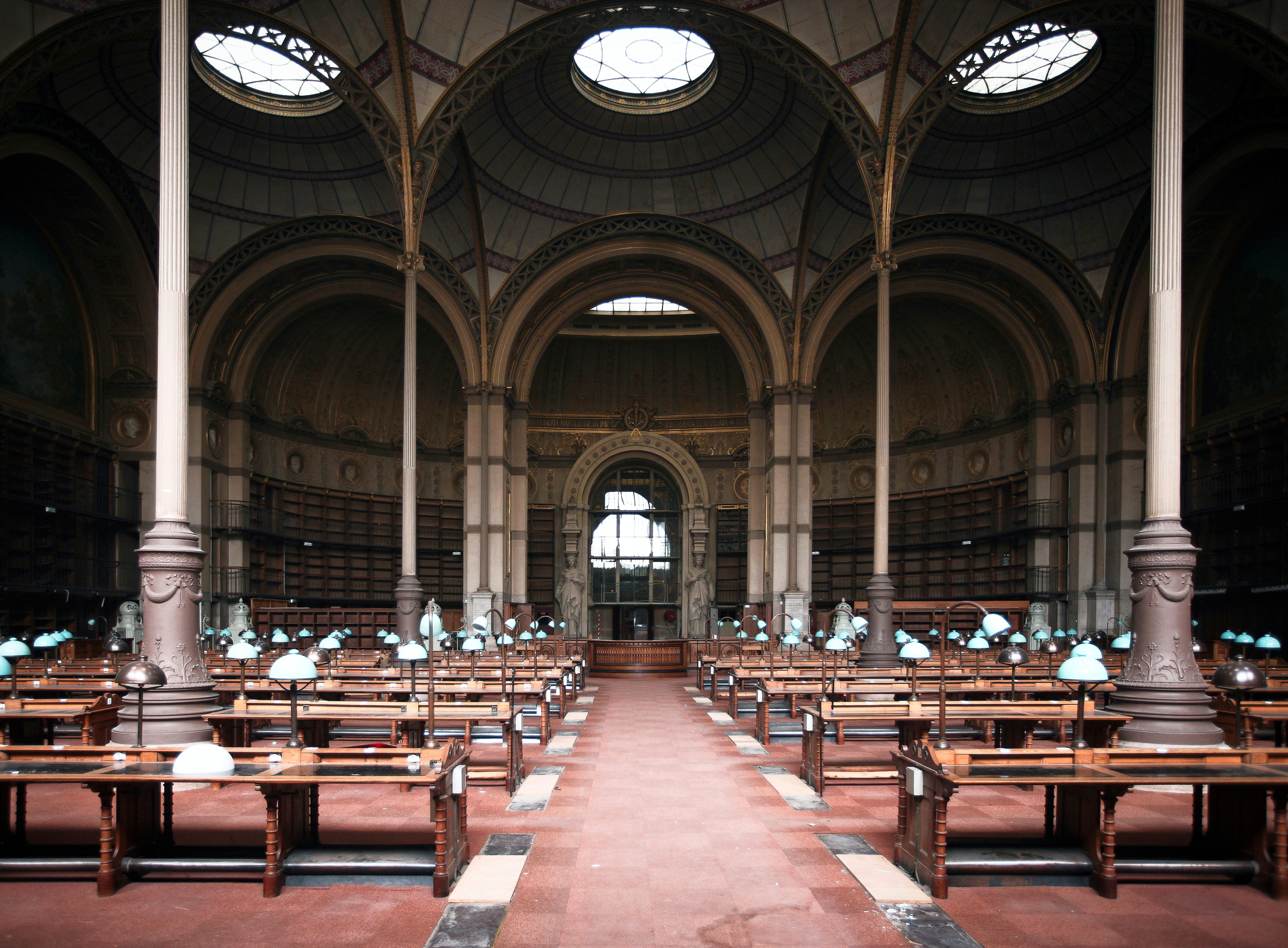
The reading room of the Bibliothèque Nationale de France, site Richelieu (1854–75), was designed by Henri Labrouste with an iron frame and glass creating the effect of a cathedral.

The rapidly growing French economy under Napoleon III led to major changes in the architecture and urban design of Paris. New types of architecture connected with the economic expansion; railroad stations, hotels, office buildings, department stores and exposition halls, occupied the center of Paris, which previously had been largely residential. To improve traffic circulation and bring light and air to the center of the city, Napoleon's Prefect of the Seine, destroyed the crumbling and overcrowded neighborhoods in the heart of the city and built a network of grand boulevards. The expanded use of new building materials, especially iron frames, allowed the construction of much larger buildings for commerce and industry.

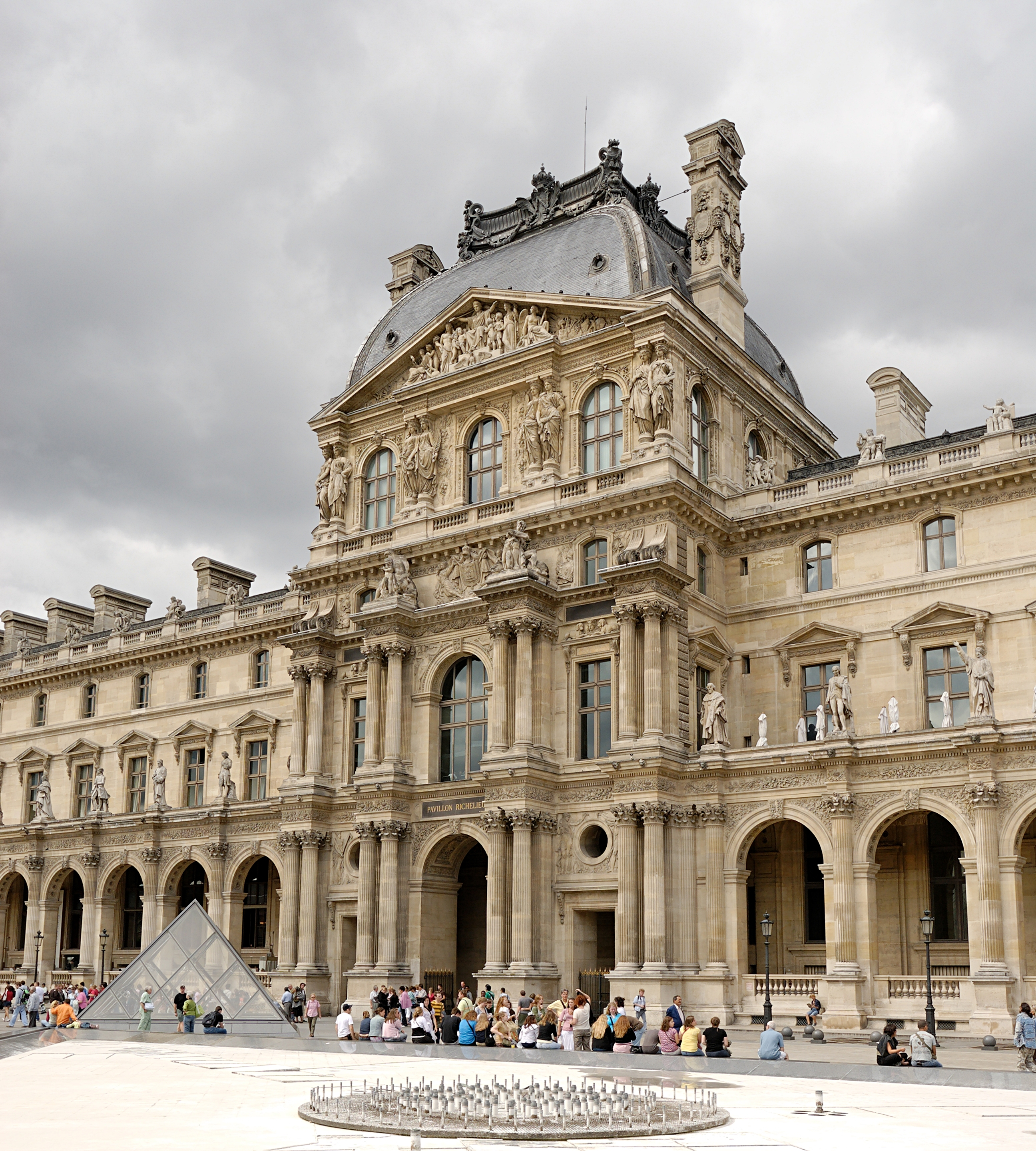
The Paviillon Richelieu of the Louvre, by Hector Lefuel (1857)

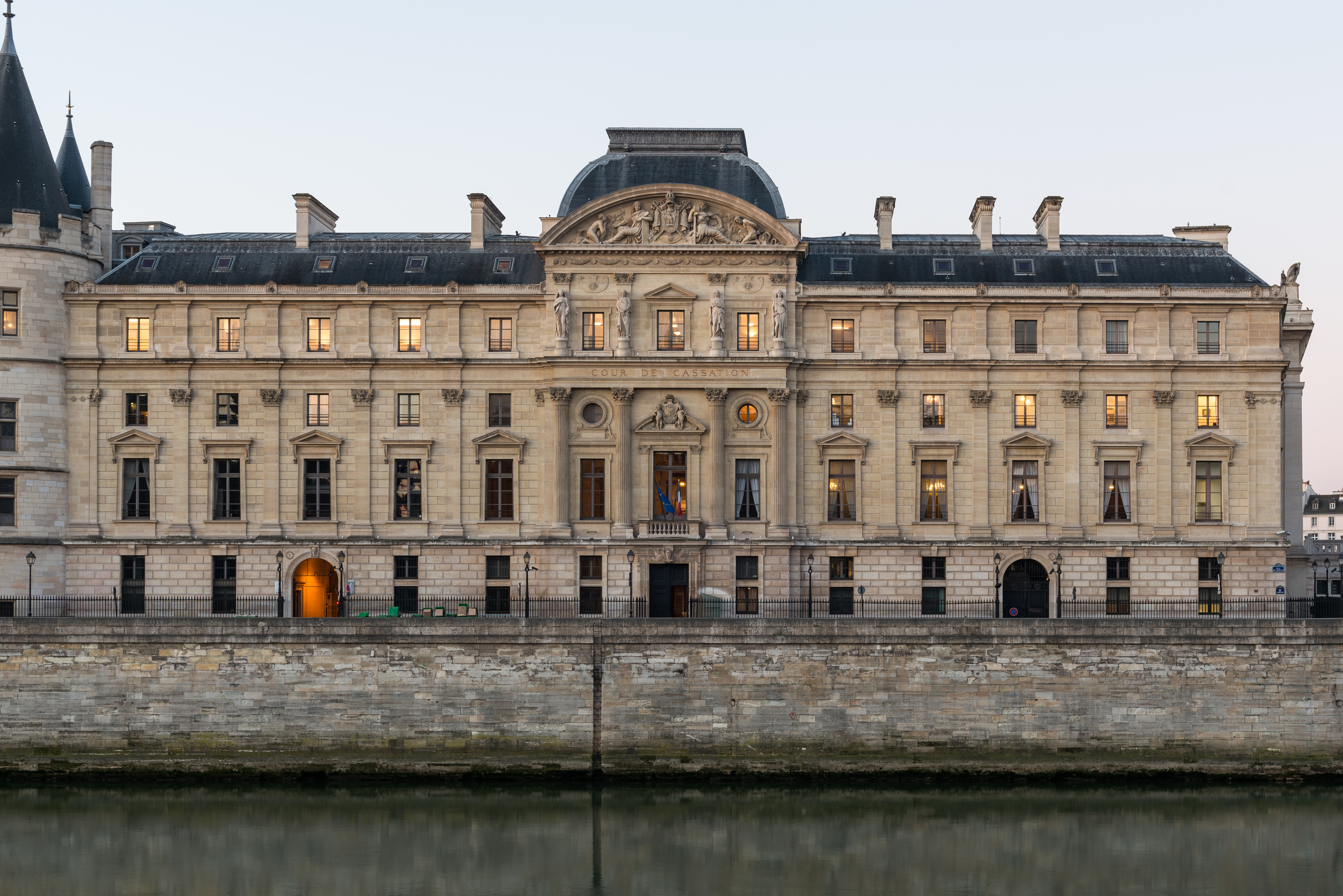
The Court of Cassation by Joseph-Louis Duc (1862–68)

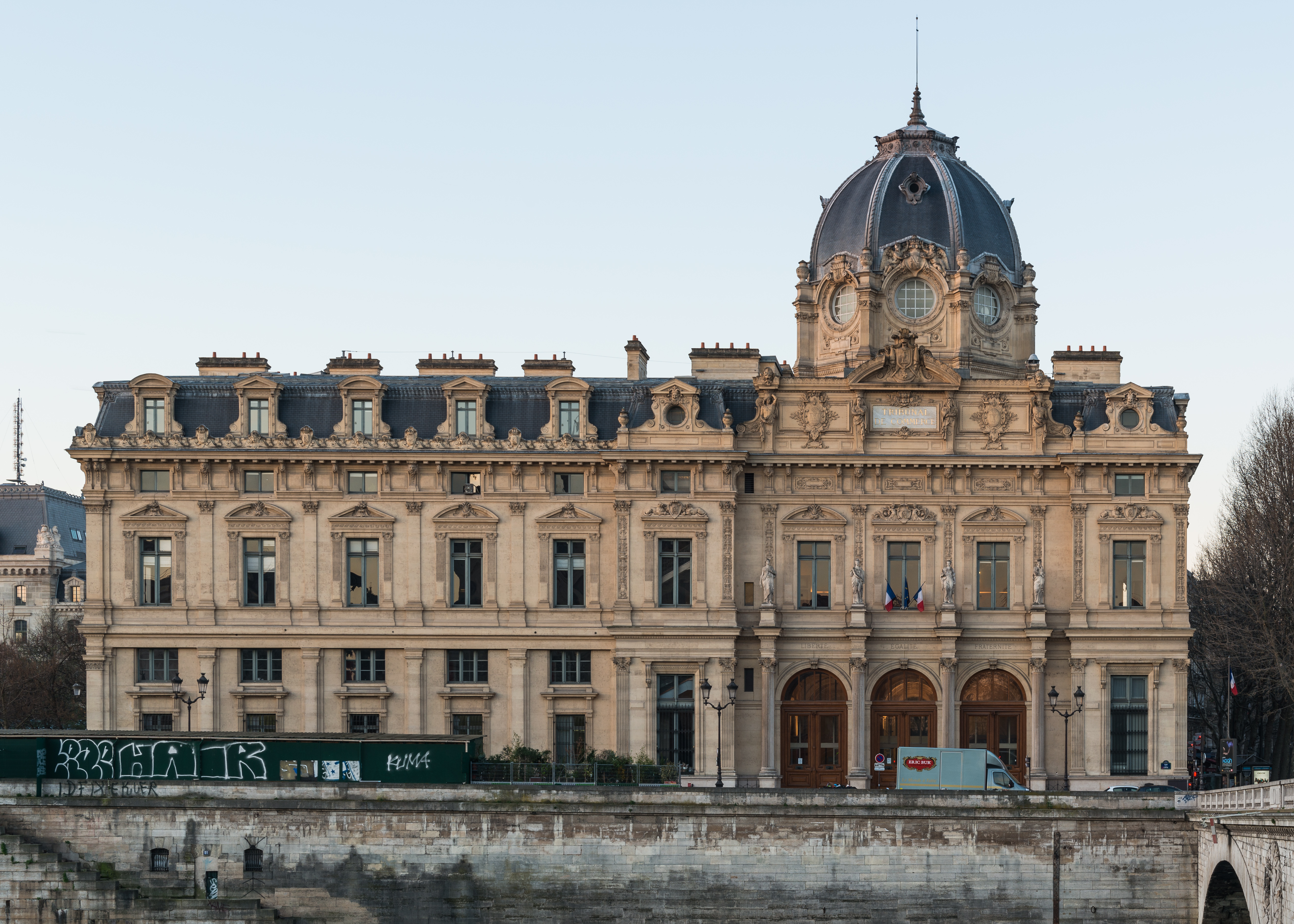
The Tribunal de commerce de Paris by Antoine-Nicolas Bailly (1860–65)

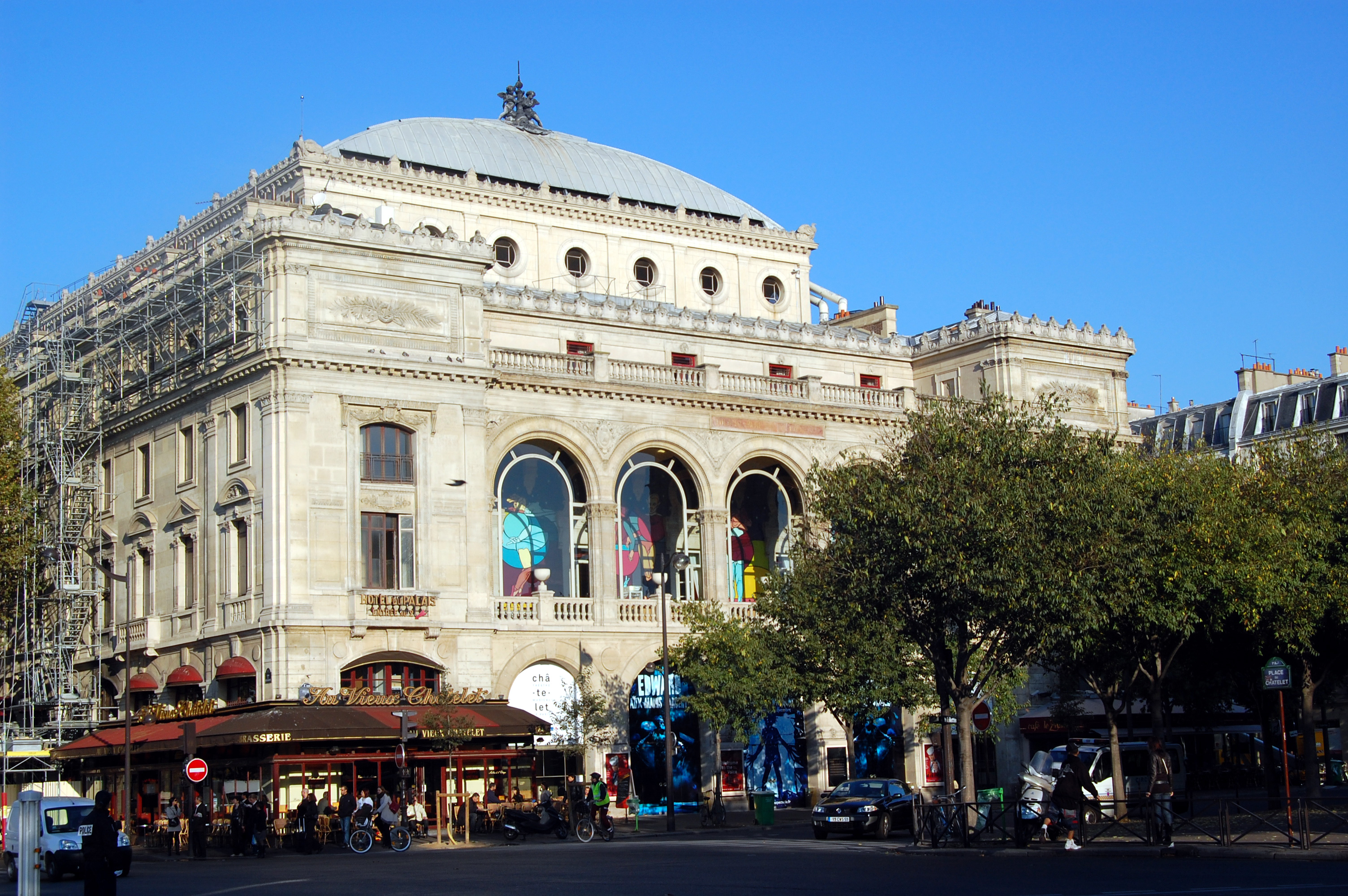
Théâtre du Châtelet by Gabriel Davioud (1859–62)

When he declared himself Emperor in 1852, Napoleon III moved his residence from the Élysée Palace to the Tuileries Palace, where his uncle Napoleon I had lived, adjoining the Louvre. His Nouveau Louvre project continued the construction of the Louvre, following the grand design of Henry IV; he built the Pavillon Richelieu (1857), the guichets of the Louvre (1867), and rebuilt the Pavillon de Flore; he broke with the neo-classicism of the wings of the Louvre built by Louis XIV; the new constructions were perfectly in harmony with the Renaissance wings.

The dominant architectural style of the Second Empire was the eclectic, drawing liberally from the architecture of the Gothic style, Renaissance style, and style of Louis XV and Louis XVI. The best example was the Palais Garnier, begun in 1862 but not finished until 1875. The architect was Charles Garnier (1825–1898), who won the competition against a Gothic-revival style by Viollet-le-Duc. When asked by the Empress Eugenie what the style of the building was called, he replied simply "Napoleon III." It was at the time the largest theater in the world, but much of the interior space was devoted to purely decorative spaces; grand stairways, huge foyers for promenading, and large private boxes. The façade was decorated with seventeen different materials, marble, stone, porphyry and bronze. Other notable examples of Second Empire public architecture include the Palais de Justice and the Court of Cassation by Joseph-Louis Duc (1862–68); the Tribunal de commerce de Paris by Antoine-Nicolas Bailly (1860–65), and the Théâtre du Châtelet by Gabriel Davioud (1859–62) and Theater de la Ville, facing each other on Place du Châtelet.

The Second Empire also saw the restoration of the famed stained glass windows and structure of Sainte-Chapelle by Eugène Viollet-le-Duc; and extensive restoration of Notre-Dame de Paris. Later critics complained that some of the restoration was more imaginative than precisely historical.

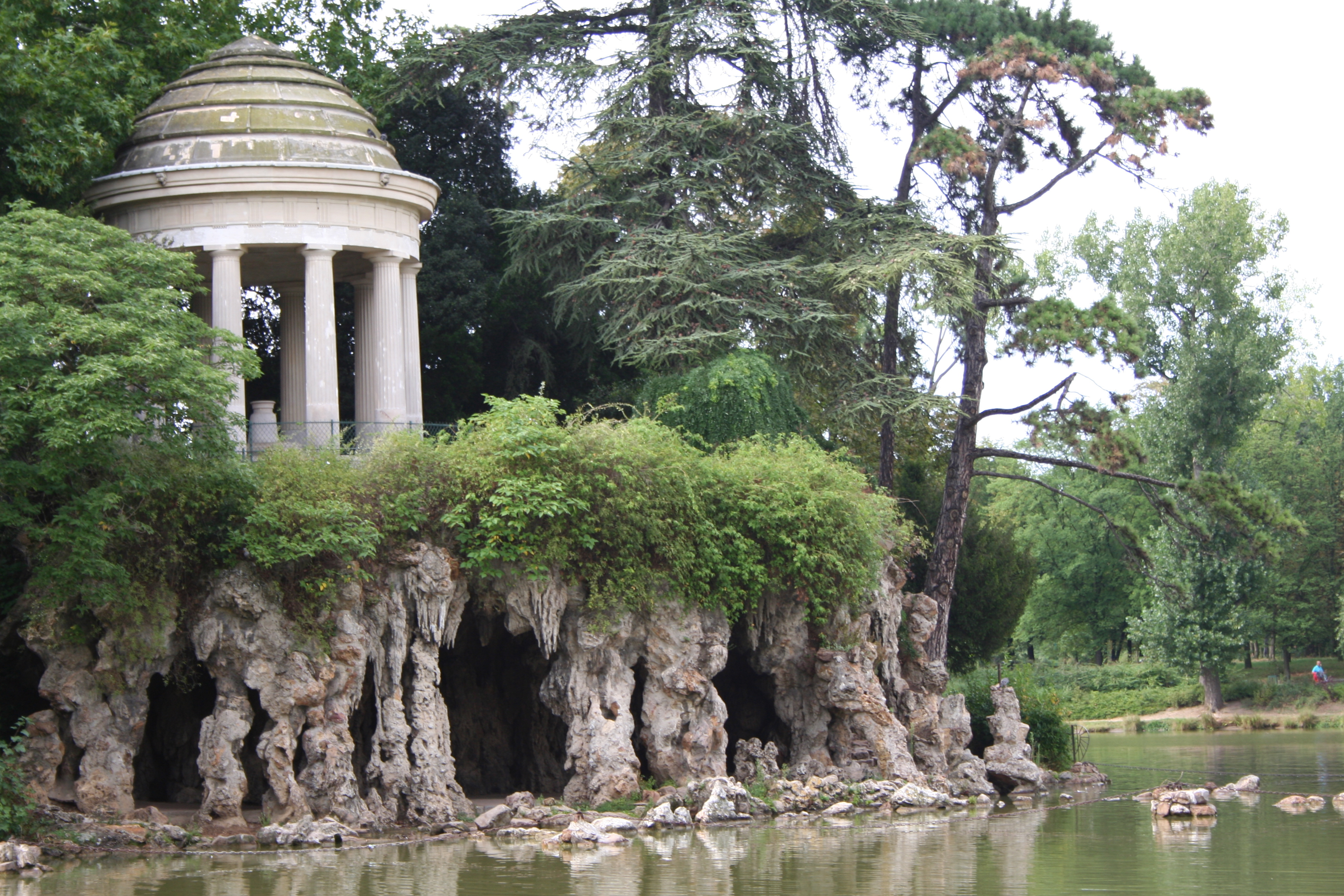
Temple of Love in the Bois de Vincennes by Gabriel Davioud (1864)

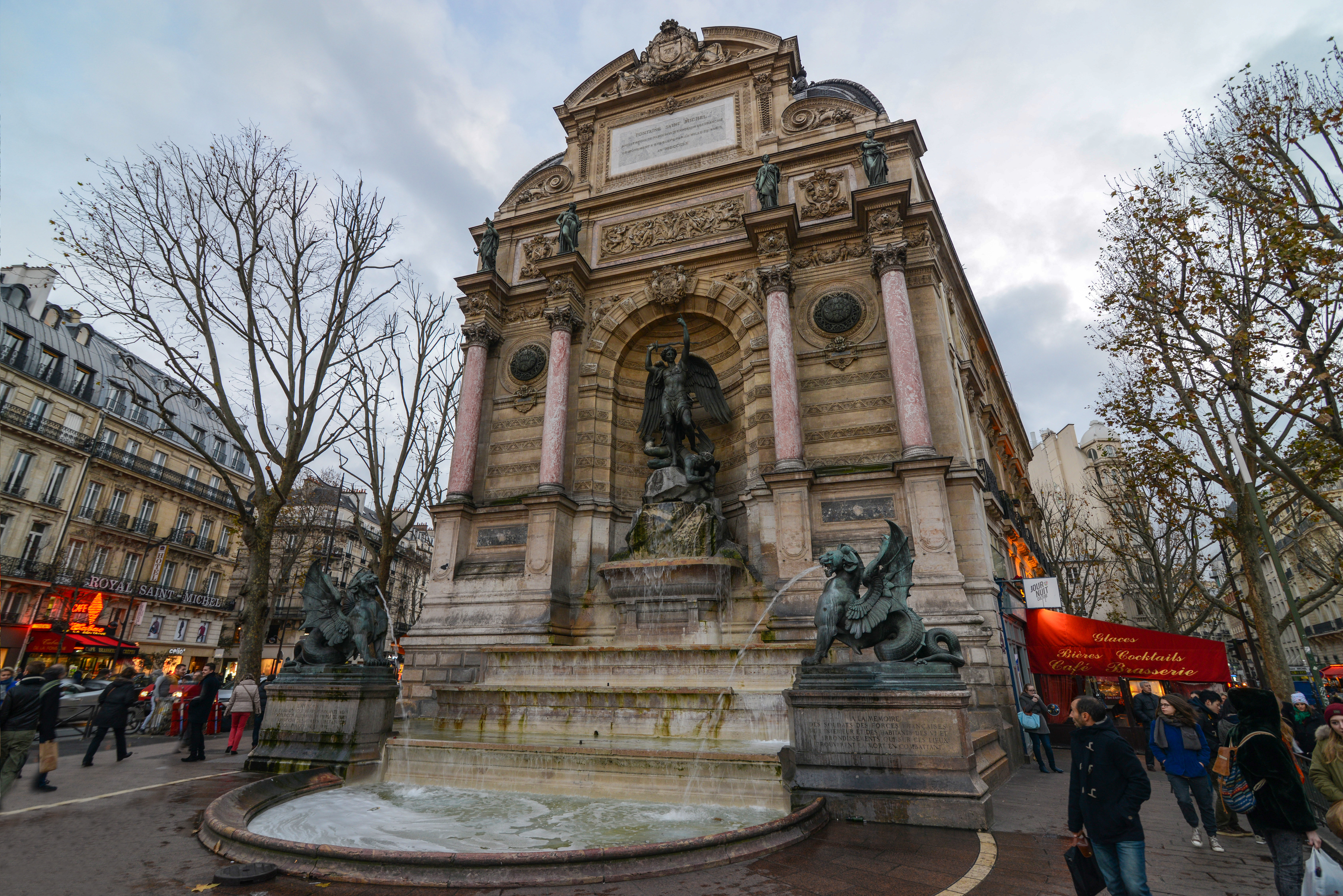
Fontaine de la Paix, or Fontaine Saint-Michel by Gabriel Davioud (1856–61), where the new Boulevard Saint-Michel met the Seine.

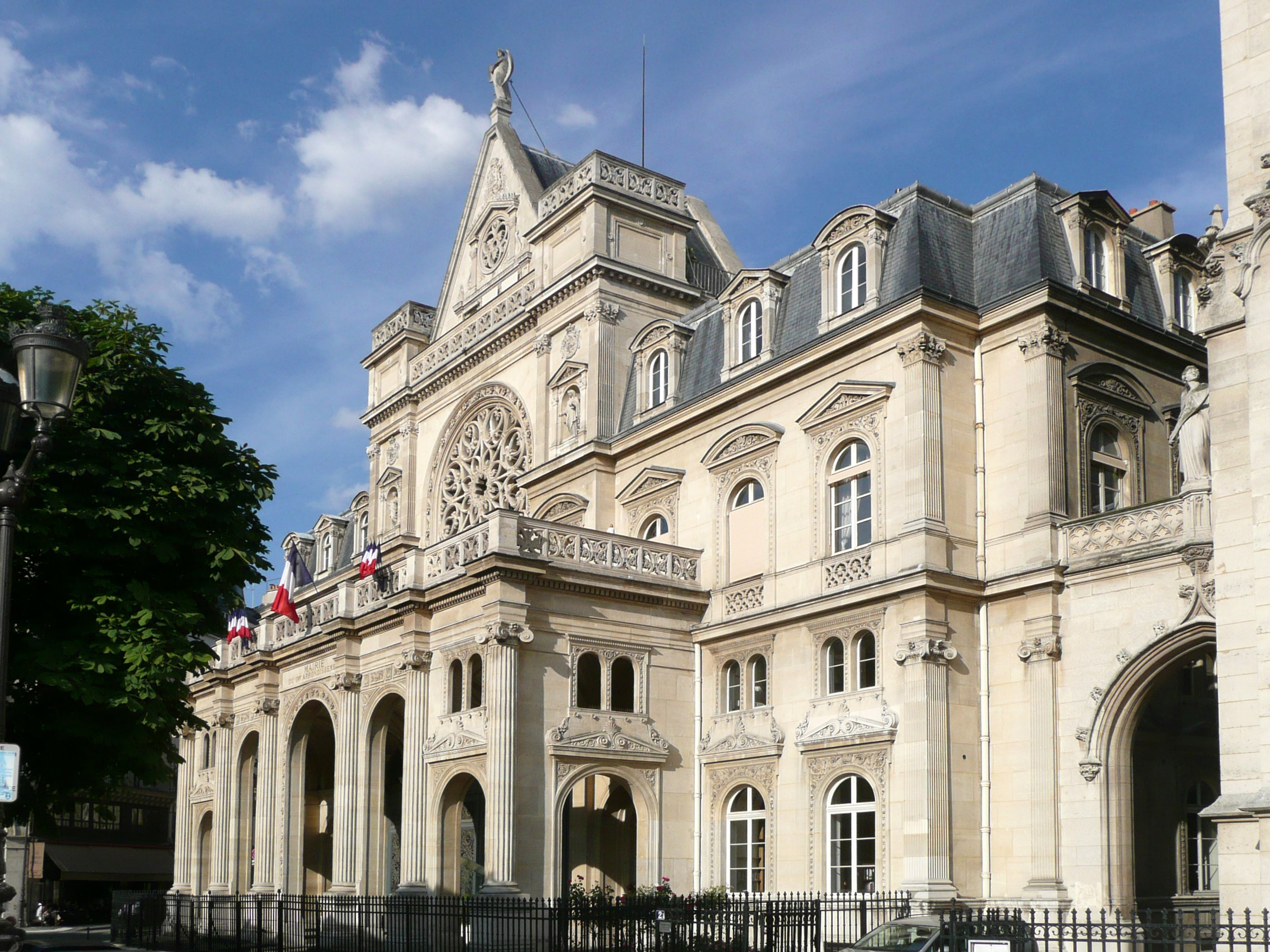
City hall of the 1st arrondissement, in neo-gothic style, by Jacques Ignace Hittorff (1855–60)

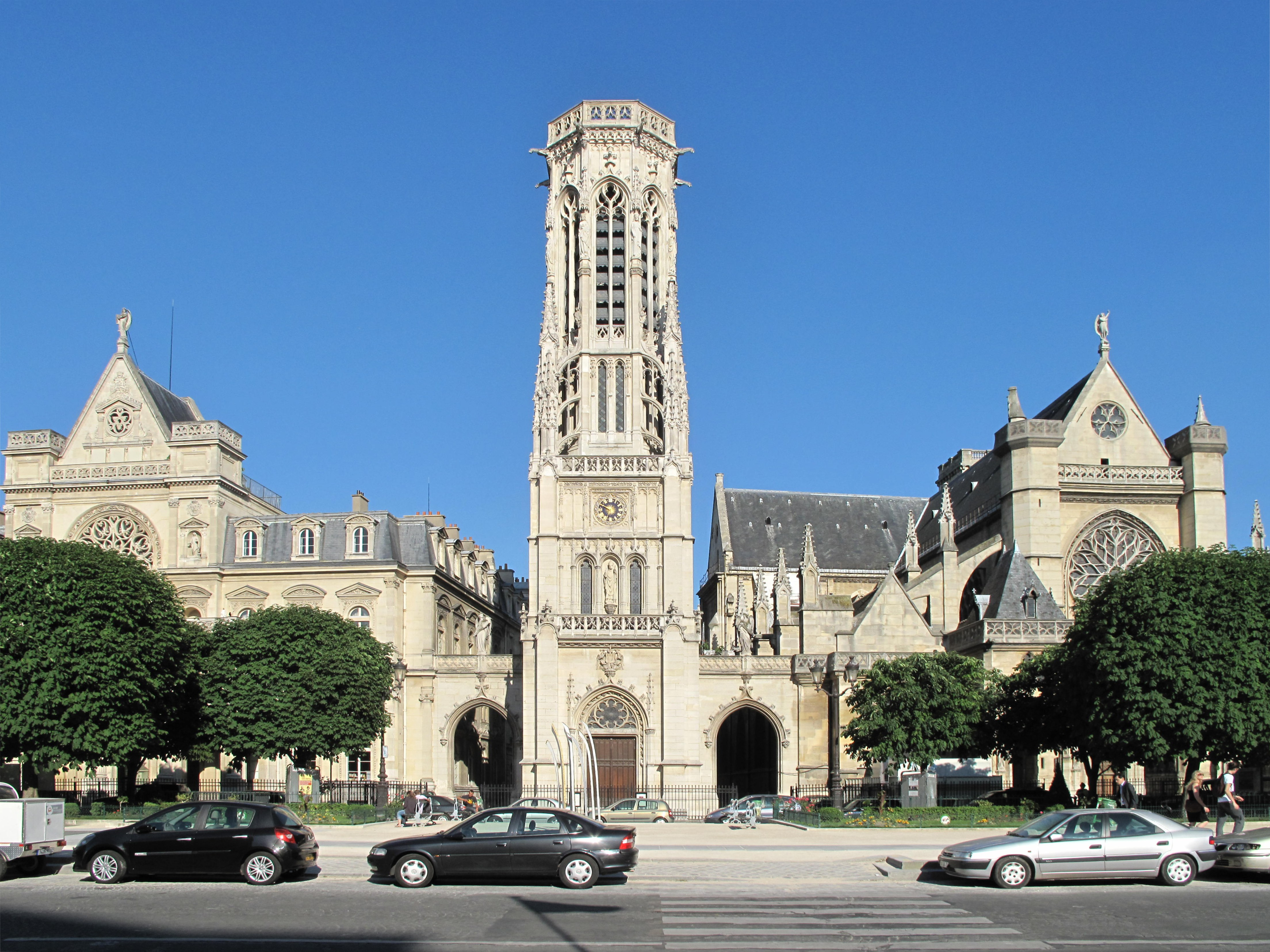
The neo-gothic bell tower of the city hall of the 1st arrondissement, by Théodore Ballu (1862), between the city hall (left) and the Church of Saint-Germain-Auxerois

The map and look of Paris changed dramatically under Napoleon III and Baron Haussmann. Haussmann demolished the narrow streets and crumbling medieval houses in the center of the city (including the house where he was born) and replaced them with wide boulevards lined by large residential buildings, all of the same height (Twenty meters to the cornice, or five stories on boulevards and four on narrower streets), with façades in the same style, and faced with the same cream-colored stone. He completed the east–west axis of the city center, the Rue de Rivoli begun by Napoleon, built a new north–south axis, Boulevard de Sébastopol, and cut wide boulevards on both the right and left banks, including the Boulevard Saint-Germain, Boulevard Saint-Michel, usually culminating in a domed landmark. if a dome was not already there, Haussmann had one built, as he did with the Tribunal de commerce de Paris and the Church of Saint-Augustin.

The centrepiece of the new design was the new Palais Garnier, designed by Charles Garnier. In the latter years of the Empire, he built new boulevards to connect the city center with the eight new arrondissements which Napoleon III attached to the city in 1860, along with new city halls for each arrondissement. New city halls were also built for many of the original arrondissements. The new city hall of the First arrondissement by Jacques Ignace Hittorff (1855–60), close the medieval church of Saint-Germain-Auxerois the historic center of the city. The new city hall was in neo-Gothic style, echoing the medieval church, complete with a rose window.

To provide green space and recreation for the residents of the outer neighborhoods of the city, Haussmann built large new parks Bois de Boulogne, Bois de Vincennes, Parc Montsouris and Parc des Buttes Chaumont to the west, east, north and south, filled with picturesque garden follies, as well as numerous smaller parks and squares where the new boulevards met. City architect Gabriel Davioud devoted considerable attention to the details of the city infrastructure. Haussmann also built a new water supply and sewer system under the new boulevards, planted thousands of trees along the boulevards, and ornamented the parks and boulevards with kiosks, gateways, lodges and ornamental grills, all designed by Davioud.

=== Religious architecture - the Neo-Gothic and eclectic styles ===
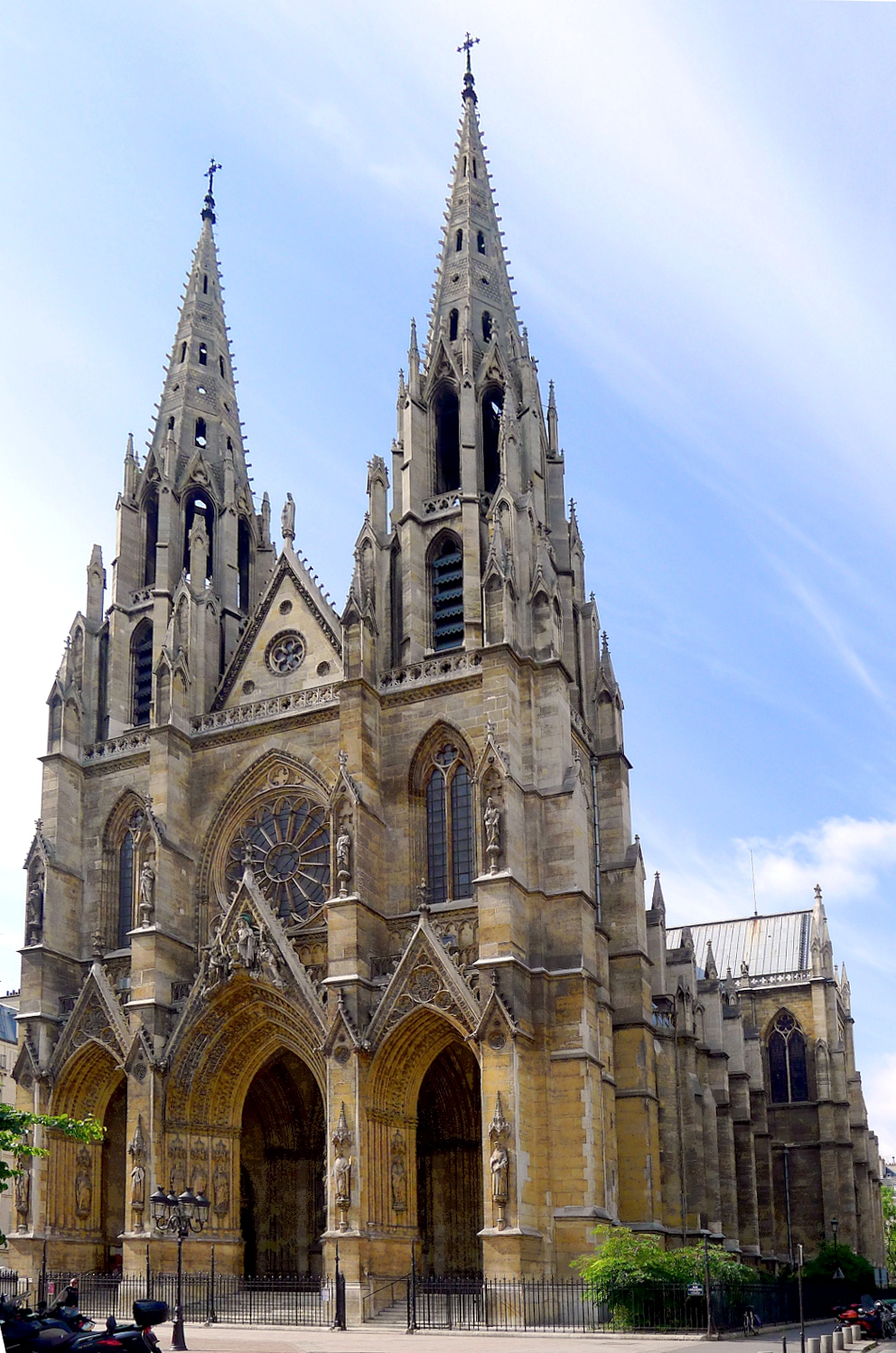
The Basilica of Sainte-Clothilde by Christian Gau, then Théodore Ballu (1841–57)

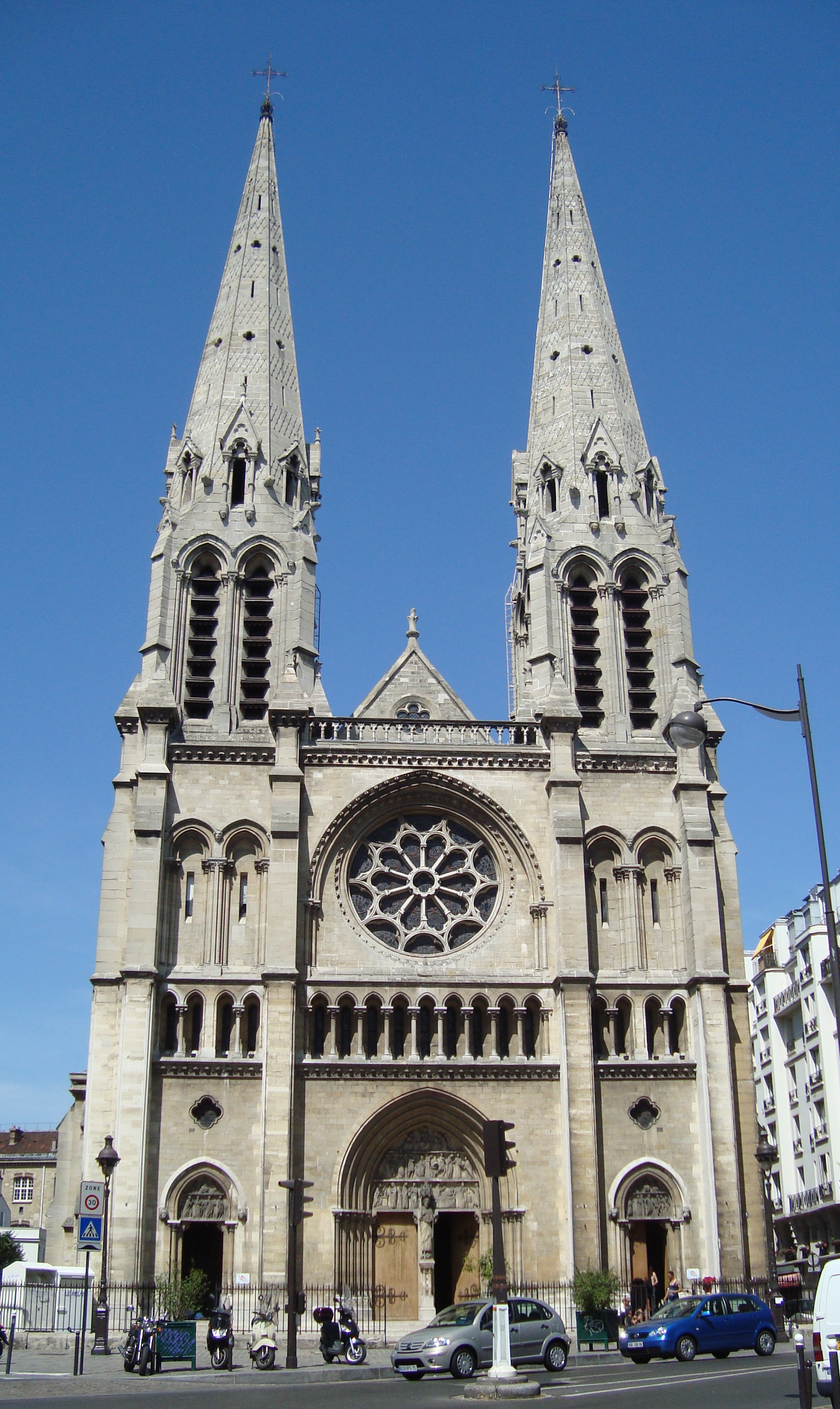
The church of Saint-Jean-Baptiste-de-Belleville in the neo-Gothic style by Jean-Baptiste Lassus (1854–59)

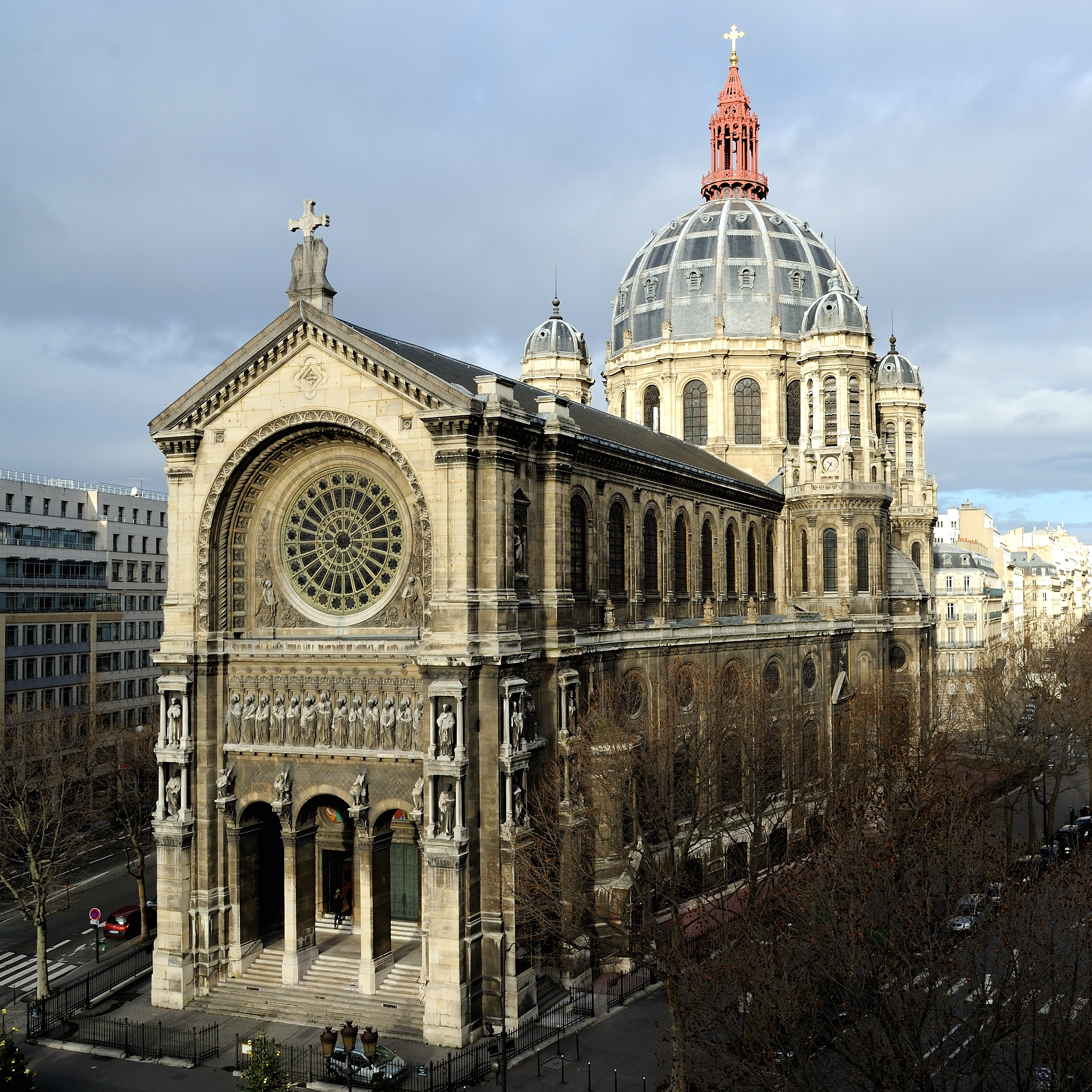
The Church of Saint Augustine (1860–71), by architect Victor Baltard, had a revolutionary iron frame but a classical Neo-Renaissance exterior.

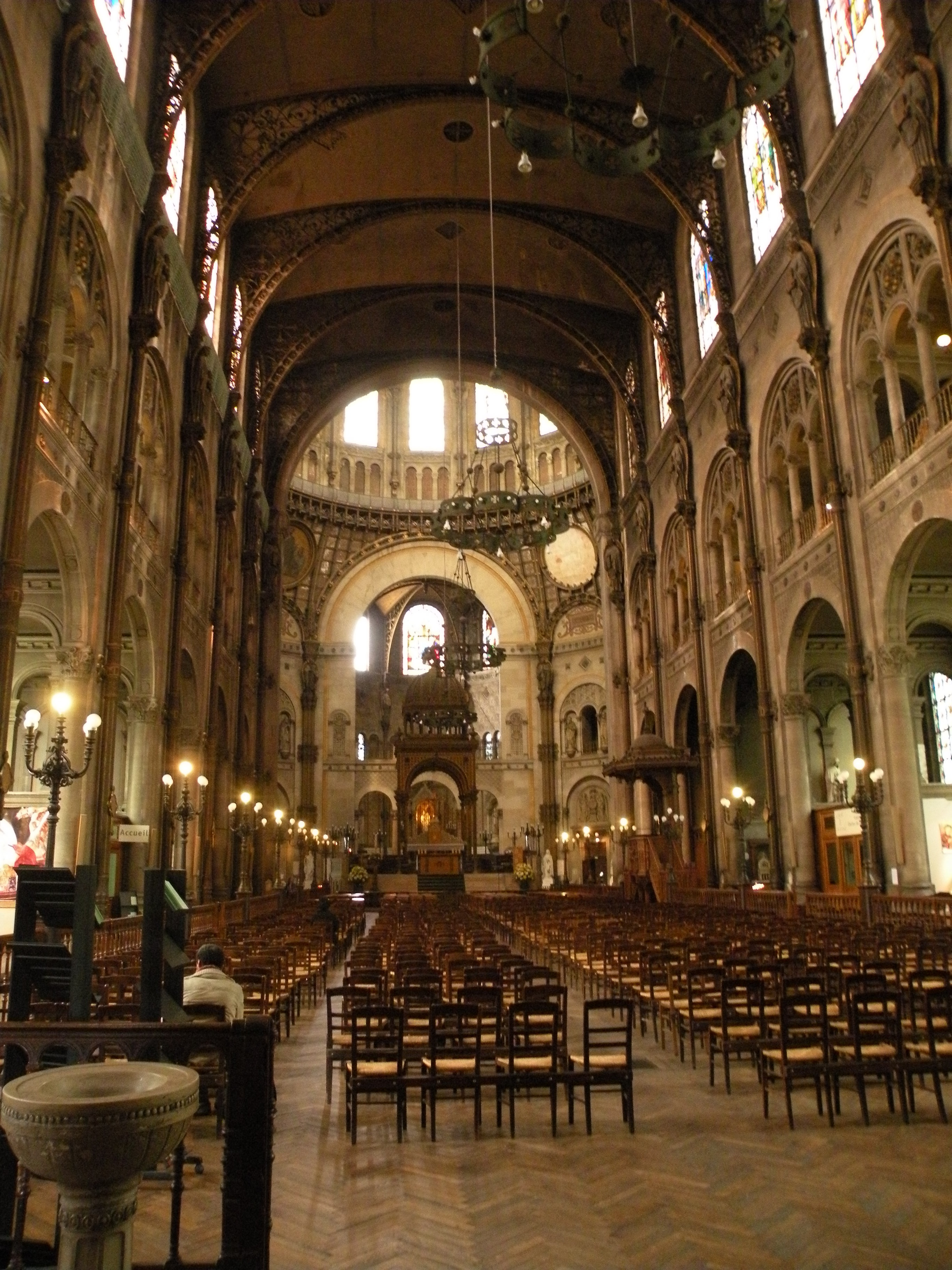
The interior of Saint-Augustin; with an iron frame supported by iron columns (1860–71)

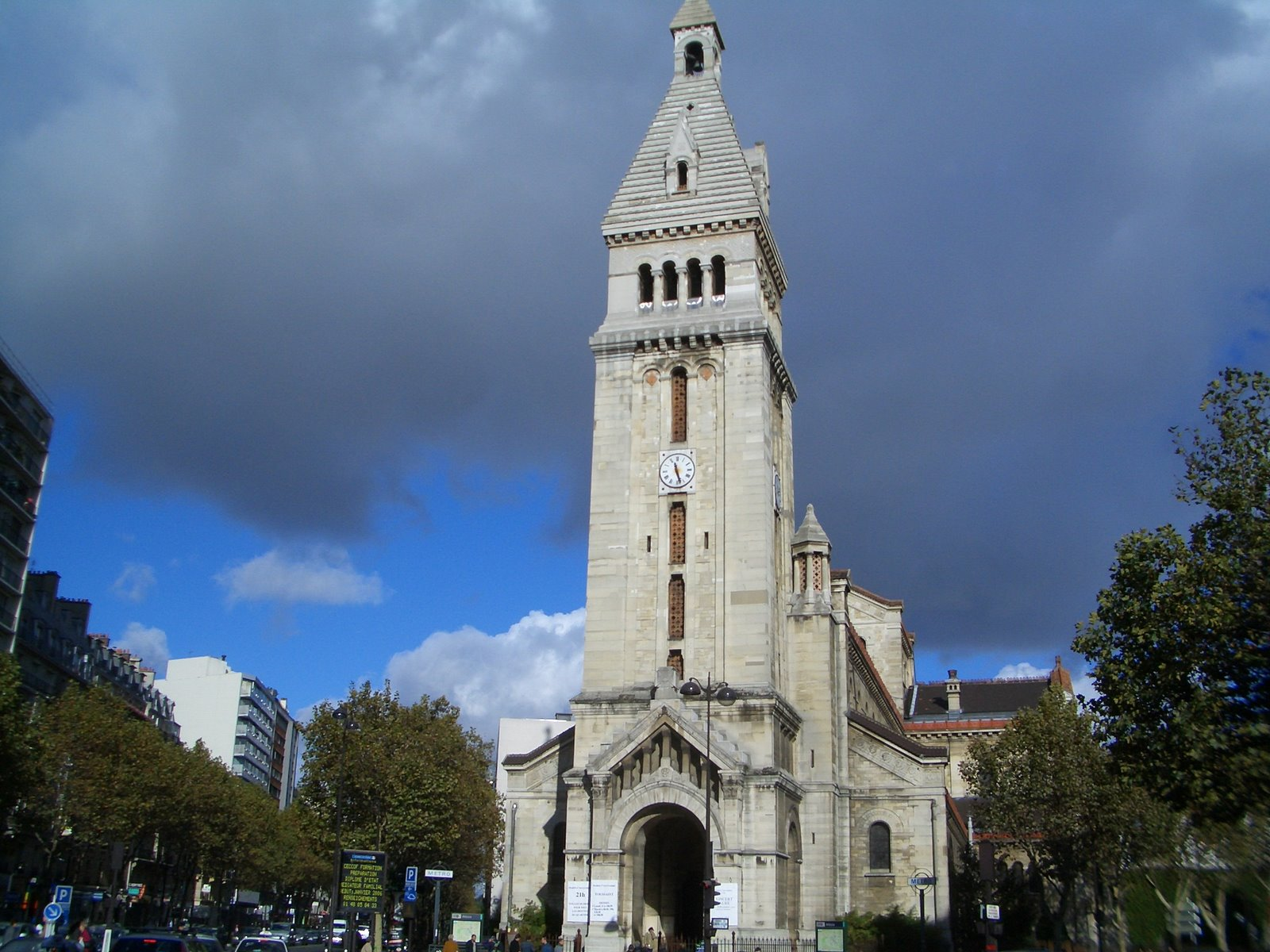
The church of Saint-Pierre de Montrouge (14th arrondissement) by Emile Vauremer (1863–70)

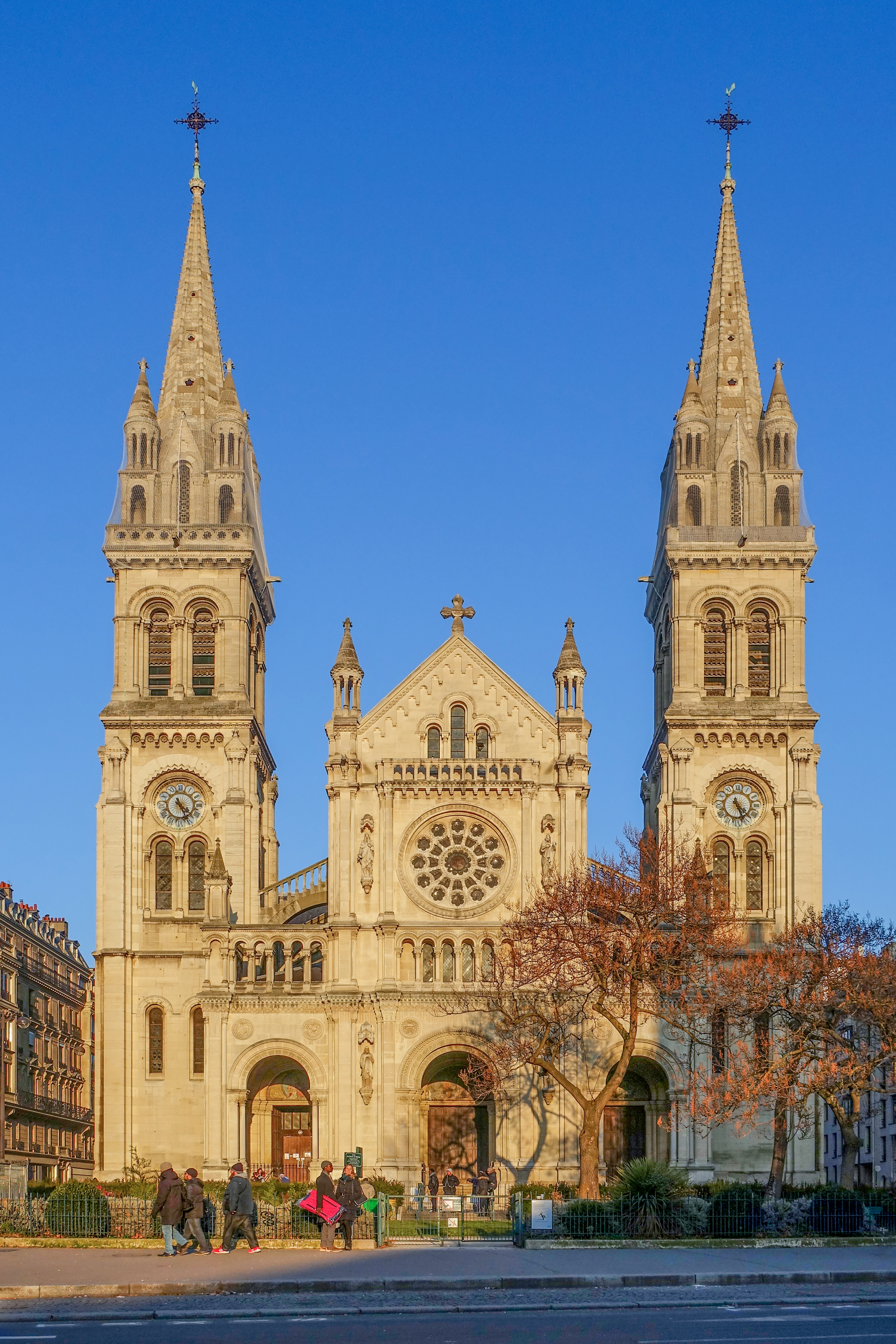
The church of Saint-Ambroise (11th arrondissement) by Théodore Ballu (1863–68)

Religious architecture finally broke away from the neoclassical style which had dominated Paris church architecture since the 18th century. Neo-Gothic and other historical styles began to be built, particularly in the eight new arrondissements farther from the center added by Napoleon III in 1860. The first neo-Gothic church was the Basilica of Sainte-Clothilde, begun by Christian Gau in 1841, finished by Théodore Ballu in 1857. During the Second Empire, architects began to use metal frames combined with the Gothic style; the Eglise Saint-Laurent, a 15th-century church rebuilt in Neo-Gothic style by Simon-Claude-Constant Dufeux (1862–65), and Saint-Eugene-Sainte-Cecile by Louis-Auguste Boileau and Adrien-Louis Lusson (1854–55); and Saint-Jean-Baptiste de Belleville by Jean-Bapiste Lassus (1854–59). The largest new church built in Paris during the Second Empire was Church of Saint Augustine (1860–71), by Victor Baltard, the designer of the metal pavilions of the market of Les Halles. While the structure was supported by cast-iron columns, the façade was eclectic.

=== Railway stations and commercial architecture ===
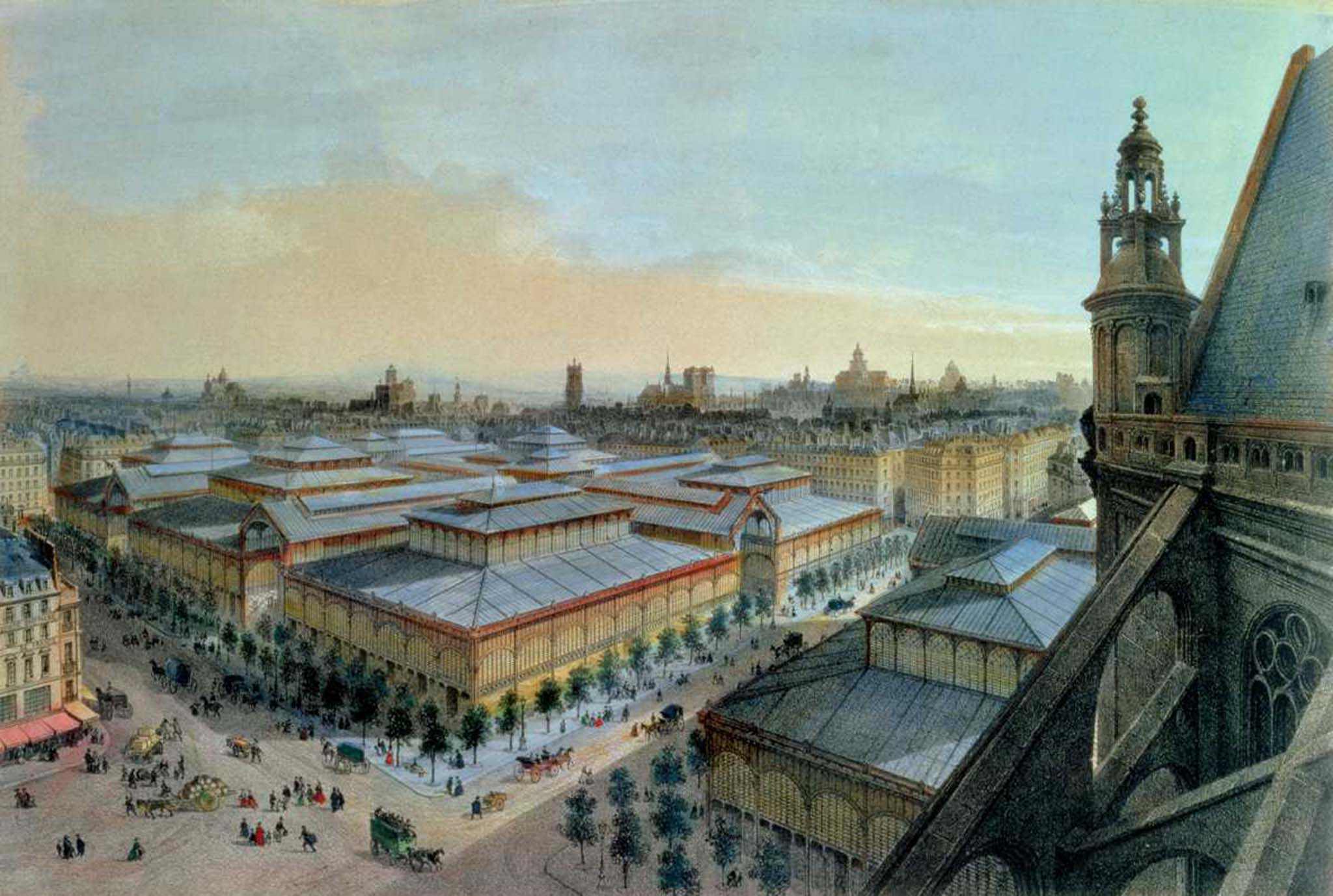
Les Halles by Victor Baltard (1853–70) seen from the roof of the church of Saint-Eustache

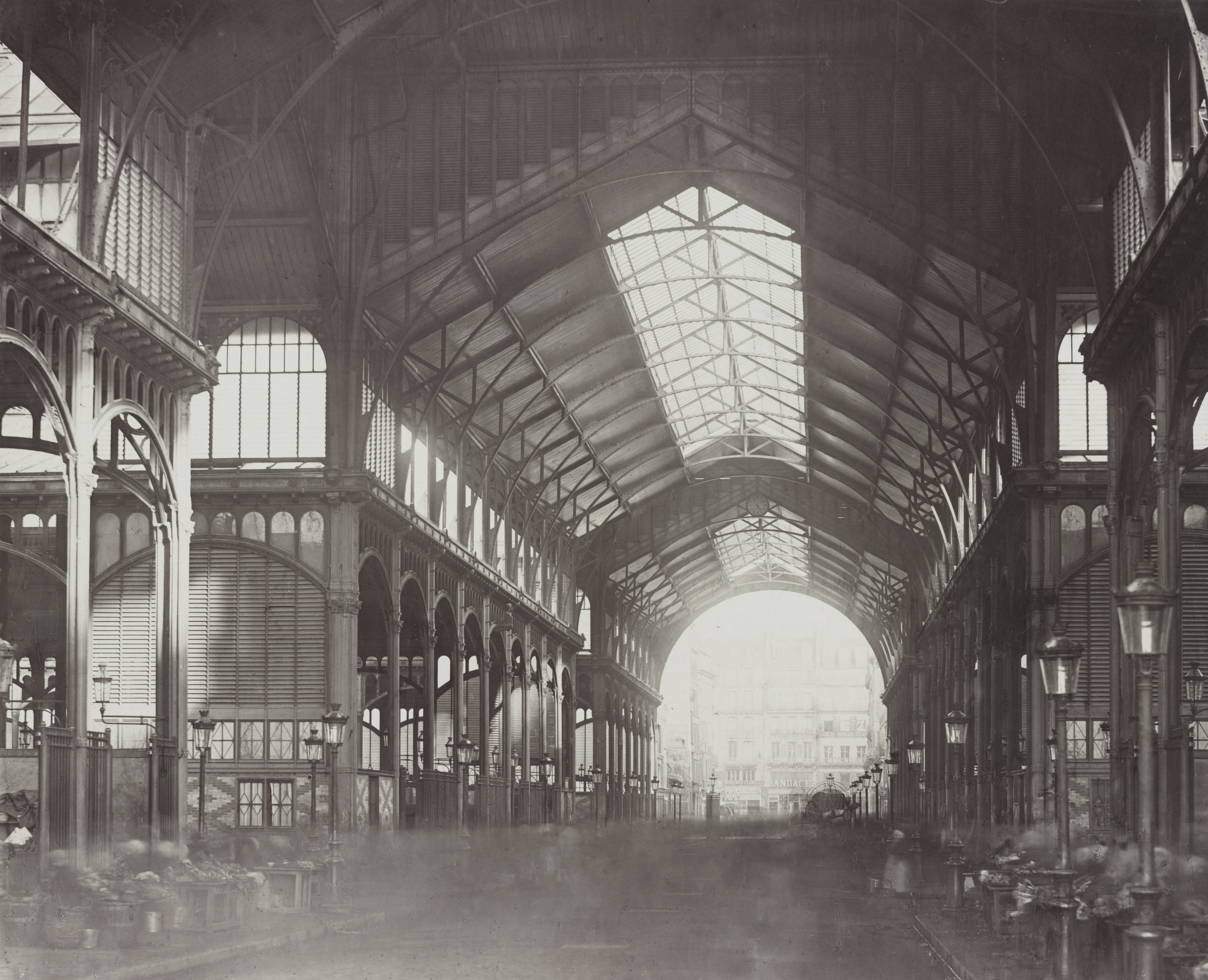
The interior of one of the giant glass and iron pavilions of Les Halles, (1853–70), the central market of Paris, designed by Victor Baltard

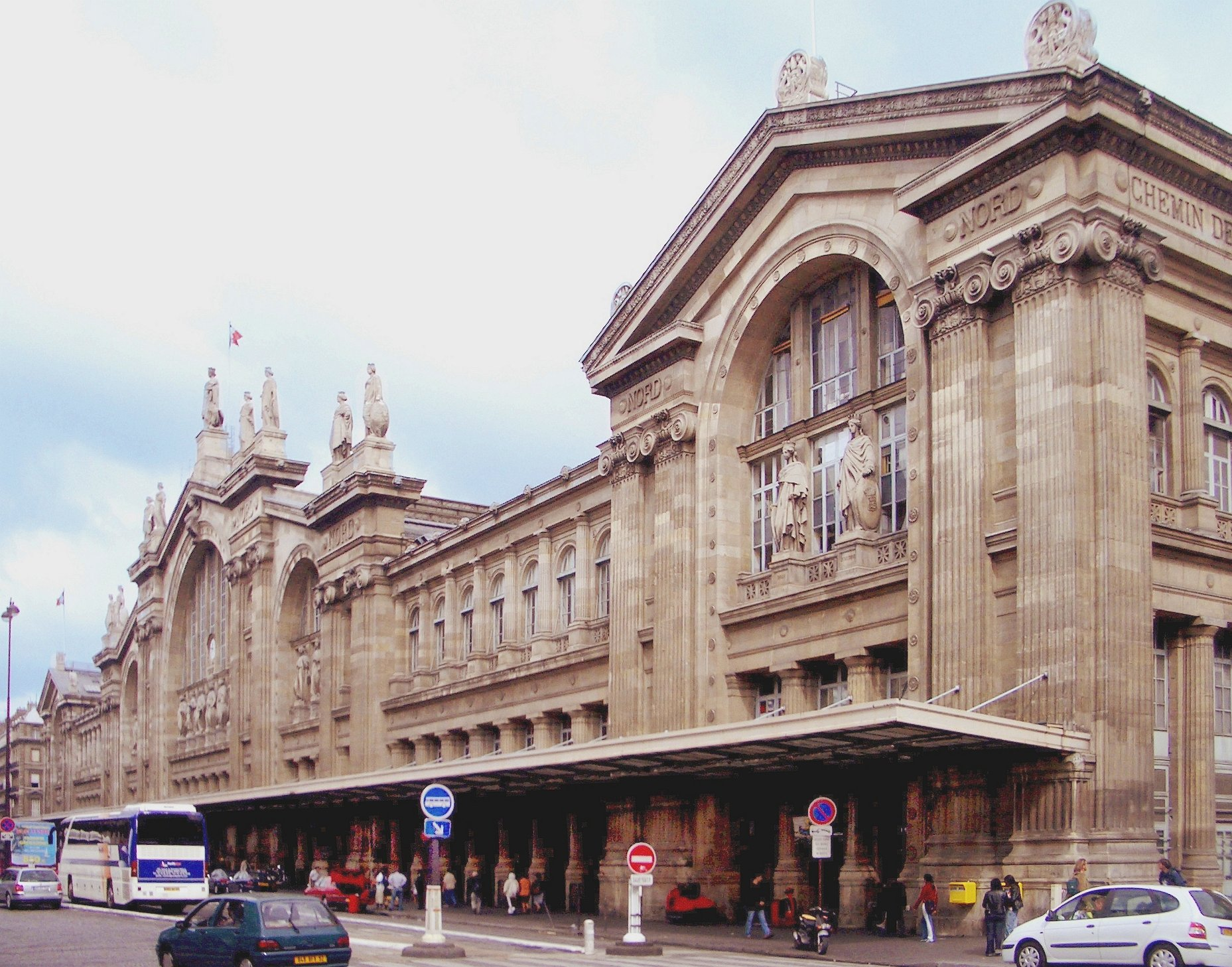
The Second-Empire façade of the Gare du Nord (1861–66) by Jacques Ignace Hittorff concealed a vast hall supported by iron columns

The industrial revolution and economic expansion of Paris required much larger structures, particularly for railroad stations, which were considered the new ornamental gateways to the city. The new structures had iron skeletons, but they were concealed by Beaux-Arts façades. The Gare du Nord, by Jacques Ignace Hittorff (1842–65), had a glass roof with iron columns thirty-eight meters high, while the façade was in the beaux-arts style faced with stone and decorated with statues representing the cities served by the railway.

The most dramatic use of iron and glass was in the new central market of Paris, Les Halles (1853–70), an ensemble of huge iron and glass pavilions designed by Victor Baltard (1805–1874). Henri Labrouste (1801–1875) used iron and glass to create a dramatic cathedral-like reading room for the Bibliothèque nationale de France, site Richelieu (1854–75).

== The Belle Époque (1871–1913) ==
The architecture of Paris created during the Belle Époque, between 1871 and the beginning of the First World War in 1914, was notable for its variety of different styles, from Beaux-Arts, neo-Byzantine and neo-Gothic to Art Nouveau, and Art Deco. It was also known for its lavish decoration and its imaginative use of both new and traditional materials, including iron, plate glass, colored tile and reinforced concrete.

=== The Great Expositions ===
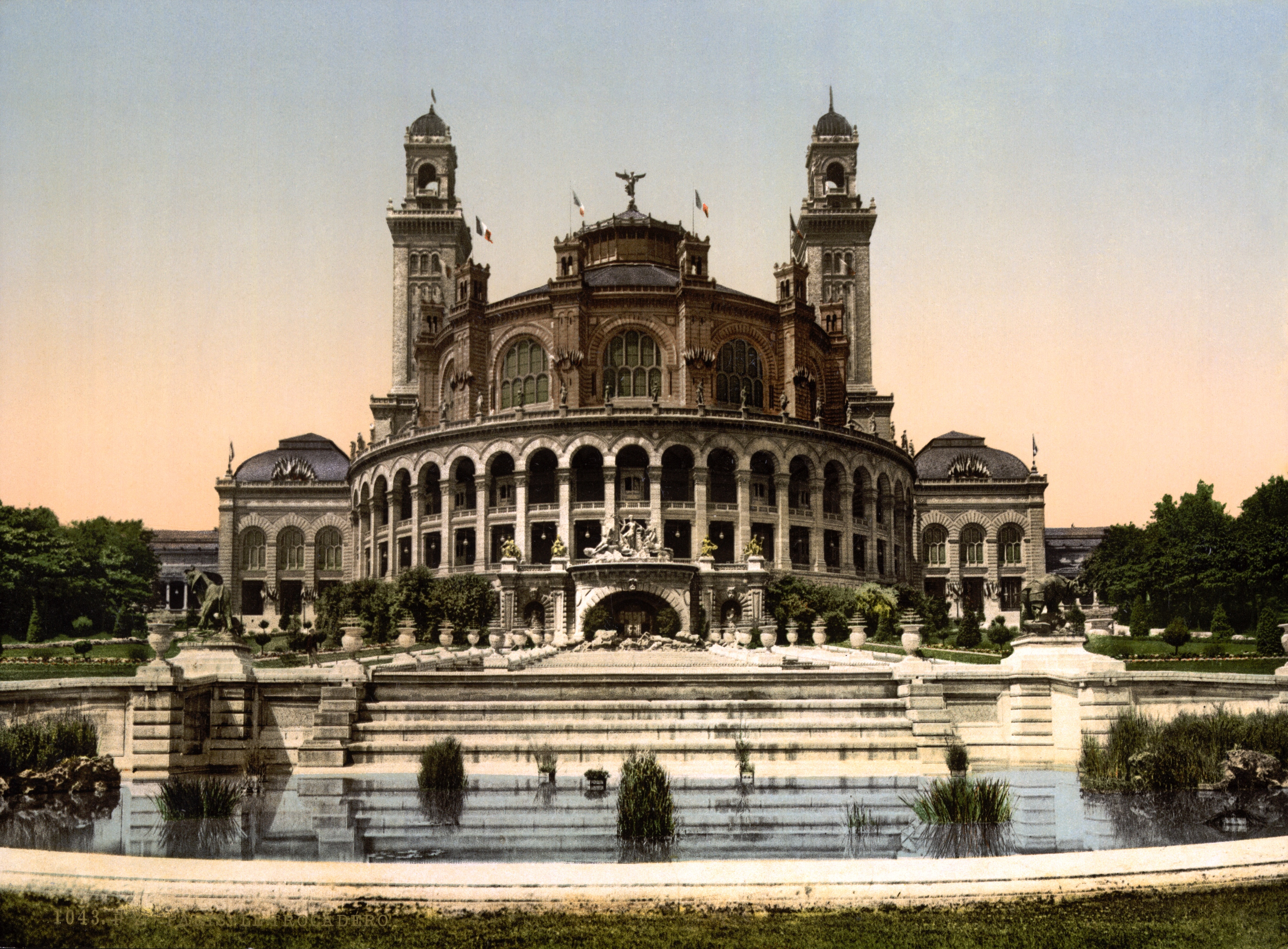
The neo-Moorish Palais du Trocadéro by Gabriel Davioud and Jules Bourdais (1876–78)

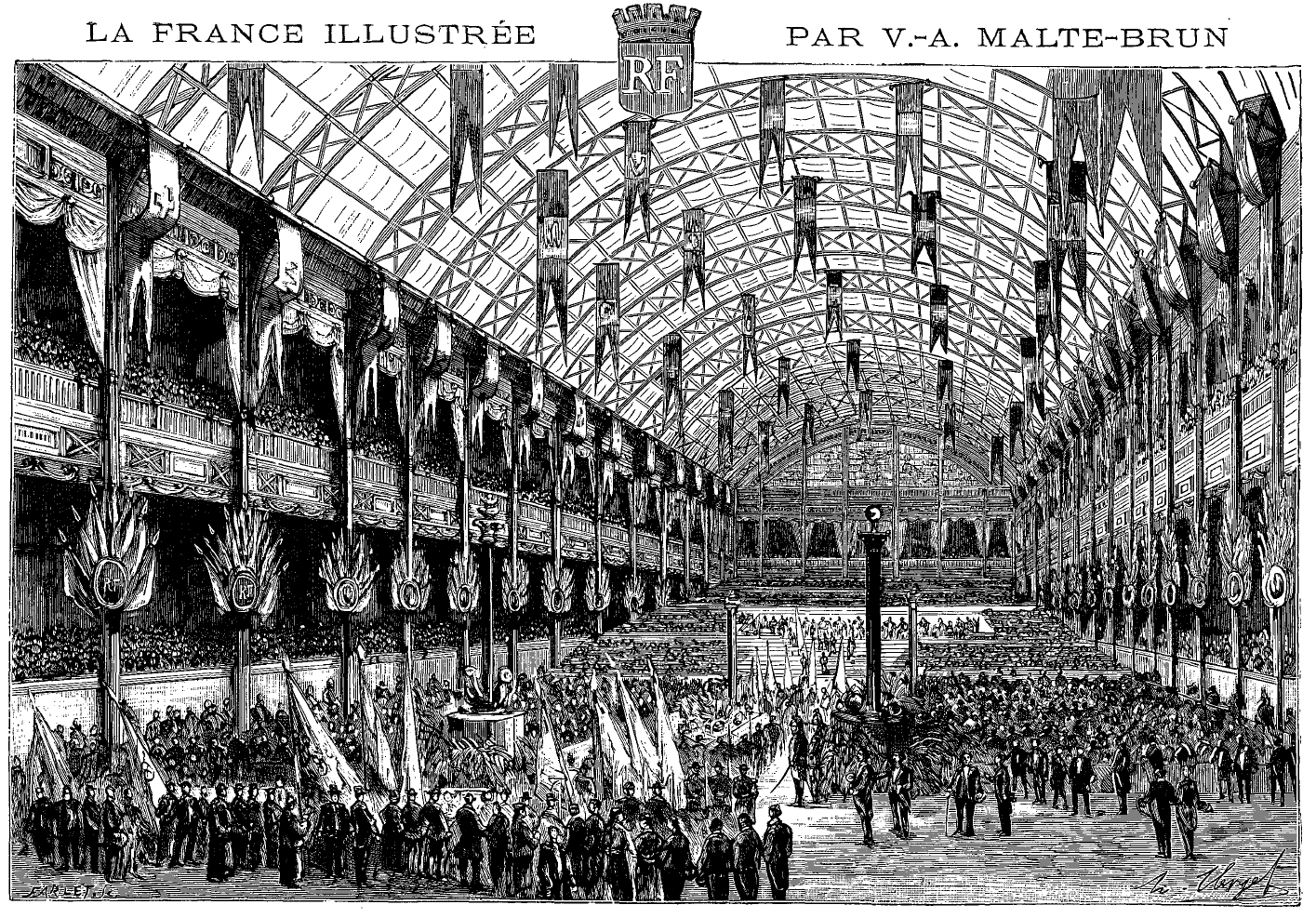
The Gallery of Machines of the Paris Universal Exposition of 1878 then the largest structure in the world

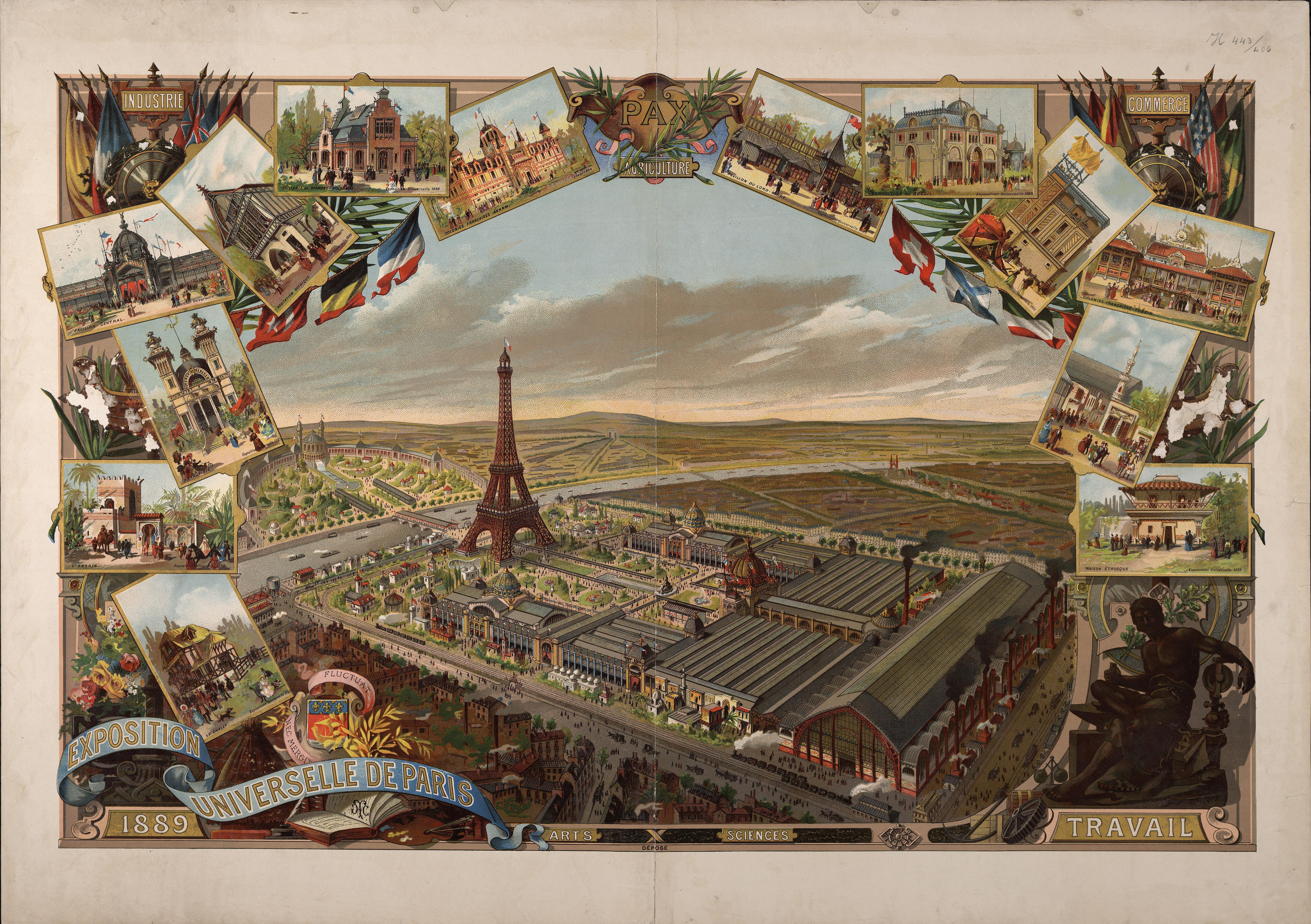
The Eiffel Tower was the gateway of the 1889 Paris Universal Exposition, and the tallest structure in the world when it was built.

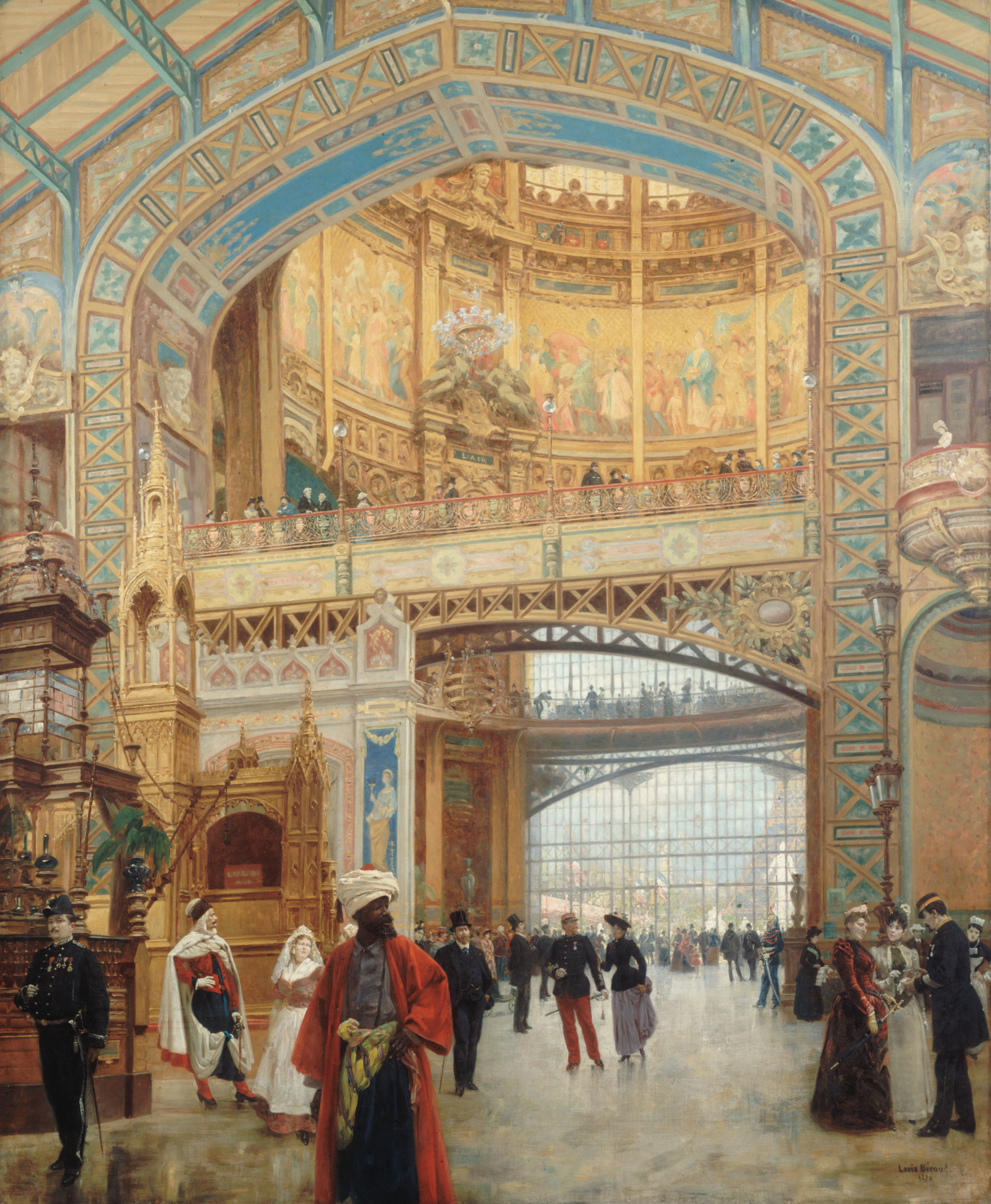
The new Gallery of Machines of the 1889 Exposition, again the largest building in the world, was decorated with colorful polychrome tiles.

The fall of Napoleon III in 1871 and advent of the Third Republic was followed by the brief Paris rule of the Paris Commune (March–May 1871). In the final days of the Commune, as the French Army recaptured the city, the Communards pulled down the column in Place Vendôme and burned a number of Paris landmarks, including the 16th-century Tuileries Palace, the 17th-century Hôtel de Ville, the Ministry of Justice, the Cour des Comptes, the Conseil d'Etat, the Palais de la Légion d'Honneur, the Ministry of Finance, and others. The interior of the Tuileries Palace was completely destroyed, but the walls were still standing. Haussmann and others called for its restoration, but the new government decided it was a symbol of the monarchy and had the walls torn down. (A fragment of the building can be seen today in the Park of the Trocadero). Most of the others were restored to their original appearance. To celebrate the rebuilding of the city the Parisians hosted the first of three universal expositions which attracted millions of visitors to Paris, and transformed the architecture of the city.

- The Paris Universal Exposition of 1878 saw the building of the Palais du Trocadéro, an eclectic composition of Moorish, renaissance and other styles, on the hill of Chaillot by Gabriel Davioud and Jules Bourdais (1876–78). It was used in the Expositions of 1889 and 1900, and remained until 1937, when it was replaced by the Palais de Chaillot.
- The Paris Universal Exposition of 1889 celebrated the centenary of the French Revolution. The Eiffel Tower, (1887–89), conceived by entrepreneur Gustave Eiffel, and built by engineers Maurice Koechlin and Émile Nougier and architect Stephen Sauvestre, was the tallest structure in the world, was the gateway to the Exposition, and the Gallery of Machines, designed by Ferdinand Dufert and Victor Contamin, was the largest covered space in the world when it was built. It combined modern engineering with colorful polychrome decoration, typical of the Belle Epoque.
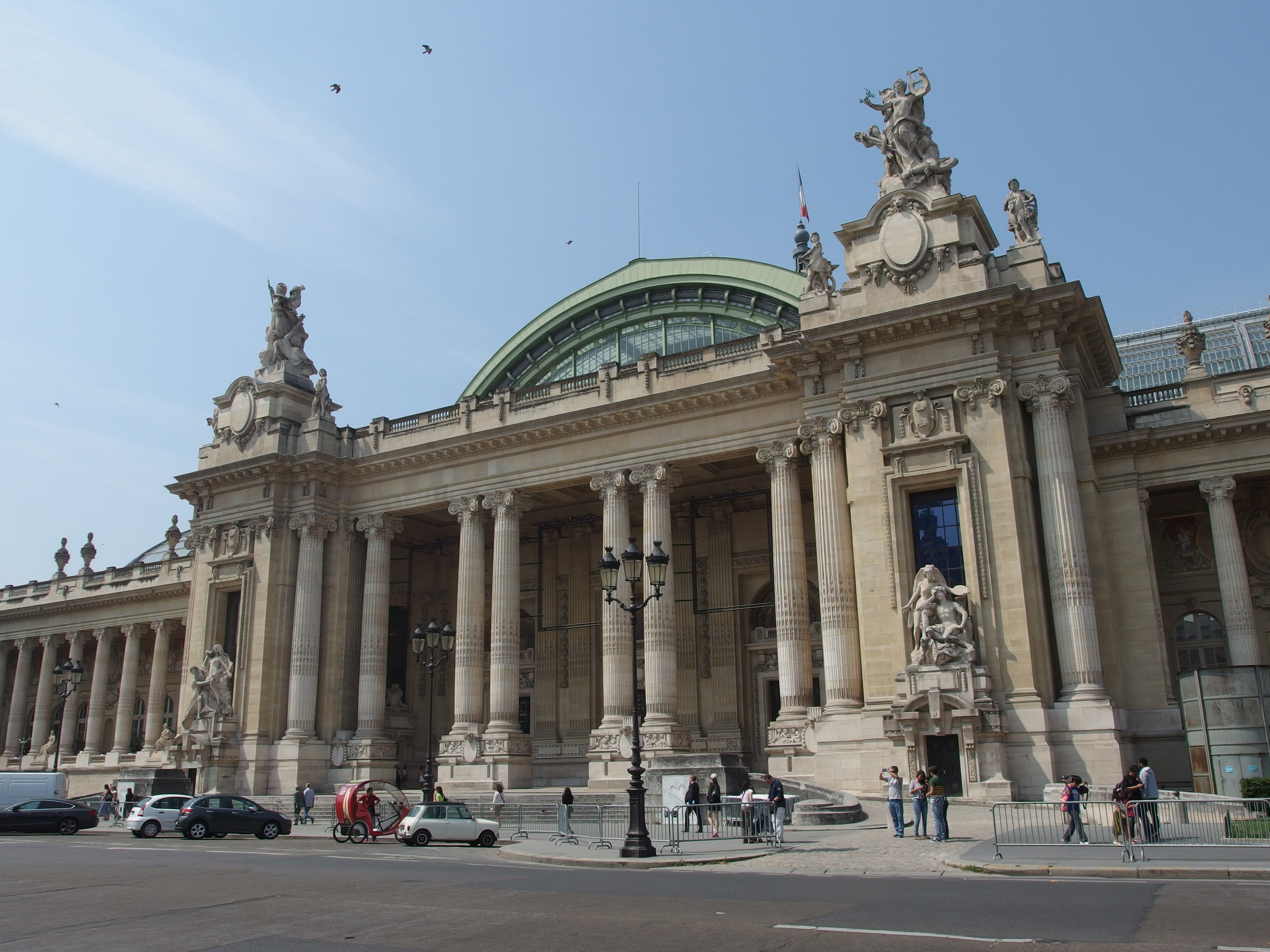
The Grand Palais, by Henri Deglane, Charles Girault, Albert Louvet and Albert Thomas (1897–1900), had a Beaux-Arts façade concealing a vast exhibit hall.

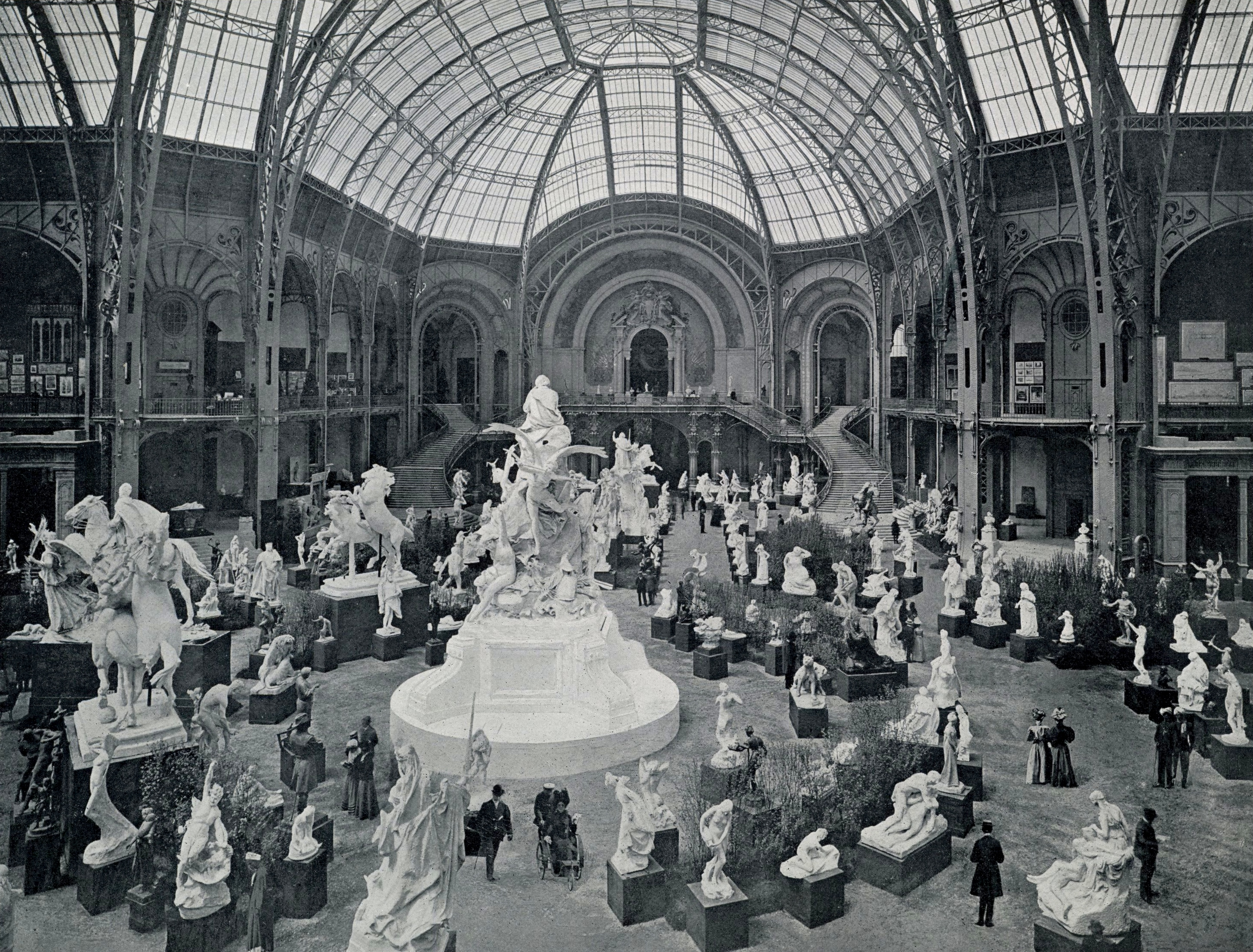
The cathedral-like glass roof of the Grand Palais was supported by slender iron pillars

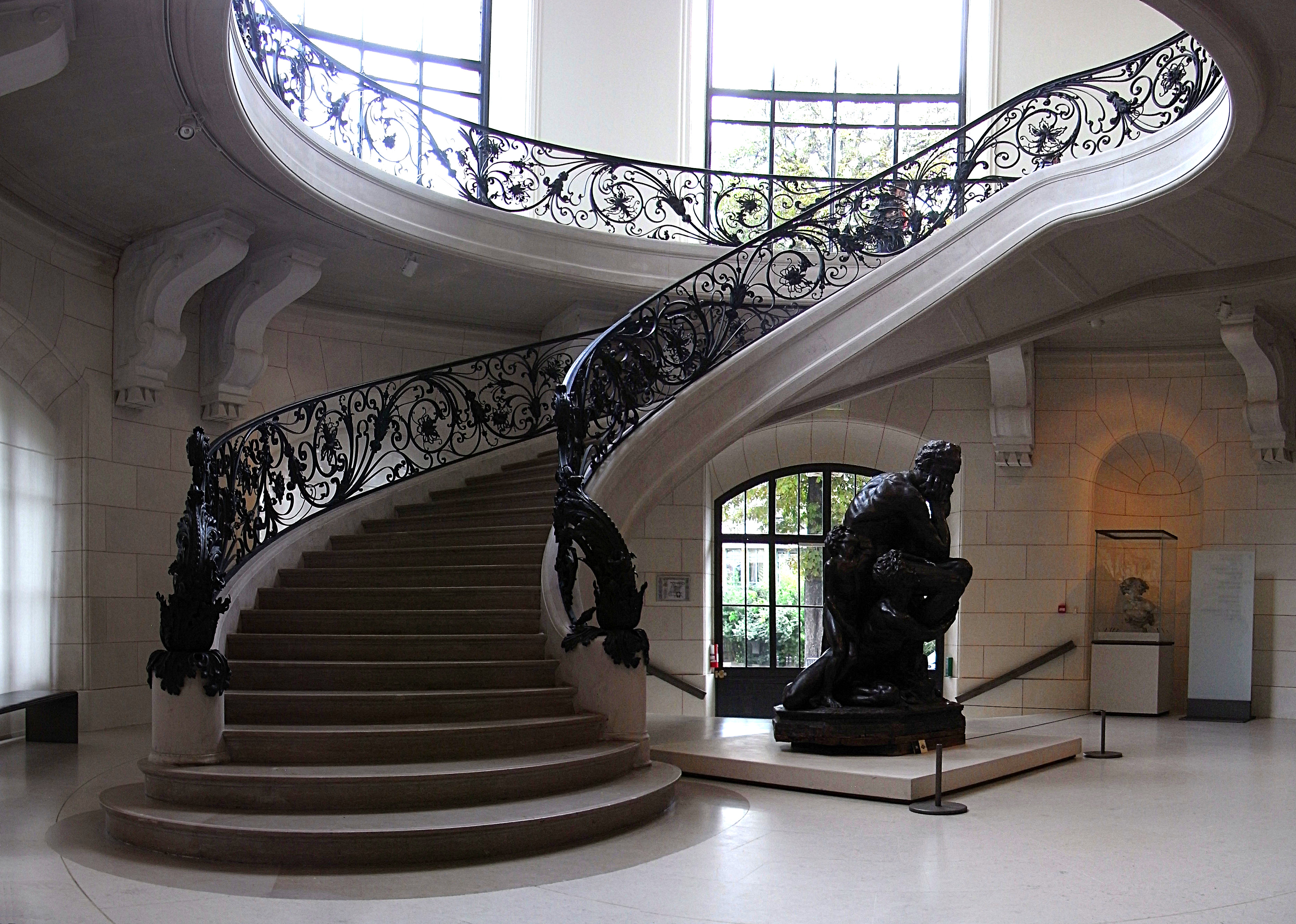
The interior of the Petit Palais, with a curving stairway built of reinforced concrete and iron.
- The Paris Universal Exposition of 1900 extended to both the right and left banks of the Seine. It gave Paris three new landmarks; the Grand Palais, the Petit Palais and the Pont Alexandre III. The Beaux-Arts façade of the Grand Palais (1897–1900), designed by Henri Deglane, Charles Girault, Albert Louvet and Albert Thomas, was a synthesis of the grand neoclassical styles of Louis XIV and Louis XV. concealed a vast interior space covered by a glass roof resting on slender iron pillars. The Petit-Palais (1897–1900), by Charles Girault, borrowed elements of Italian Renaissance architecture, and French neoclassical decorative elements from Les Invalides, the hotels beside the Place de la Concorde and the palatial stables of the Château de Chantilly by Jean Aubert. Its interior was more revolutionary than the Grand Palais; Girault used reinforced concrete and iron to create a winding stairway along brightly lit galleries. The style of these two buildings, along with the colossal neoclassical style of Louis XVI, influenced the design of Paris residential and commercial buildings until 1920.

The Art Nouveau became the most famous style of the Belle Époque, particularly associated with the Paris Métro station entrances designed by Hector Guimard, and with a handful of other buildings, including Guimard's Castel Béranger (1898) at 14 rue La Fontaine, in the 16th arrondissement, and the ceramic-sculpture covered house by architect Jules Lavirotte at 29 Avenue Rapp (7th arrondissement). The enthusiasm for Art Nouveau did not last long; in 1904 the Guimard Metro entrance at Place de l'Opera it was replaced by a more classical entrance. Beginning in 1912, all the Guimard metro entrances were replaced with functional entrances without decoration.

=== Religious architecture ===
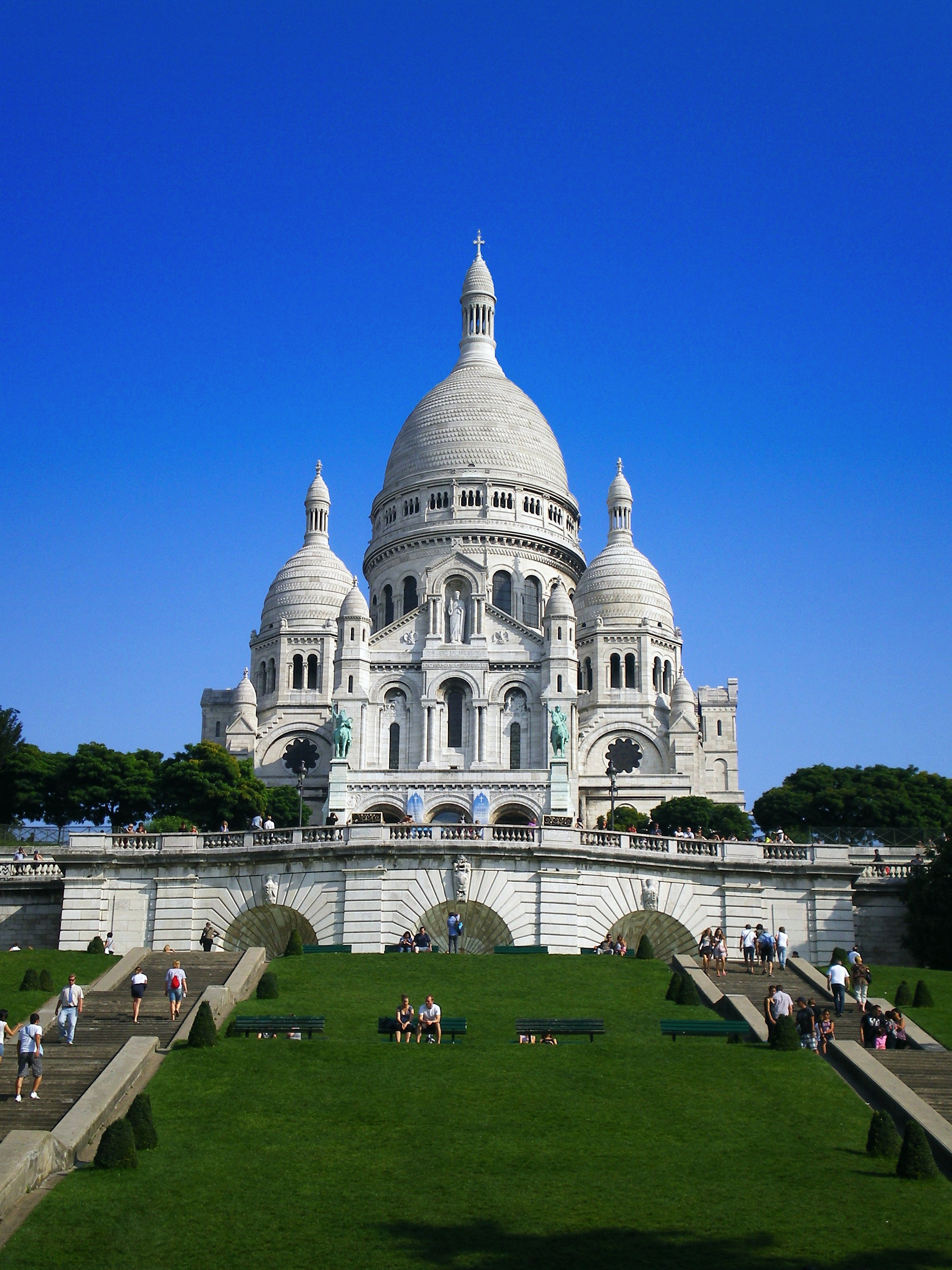
The Basilica of Sacré-Cœur, designed by Paul Abadie, (1874–1914)

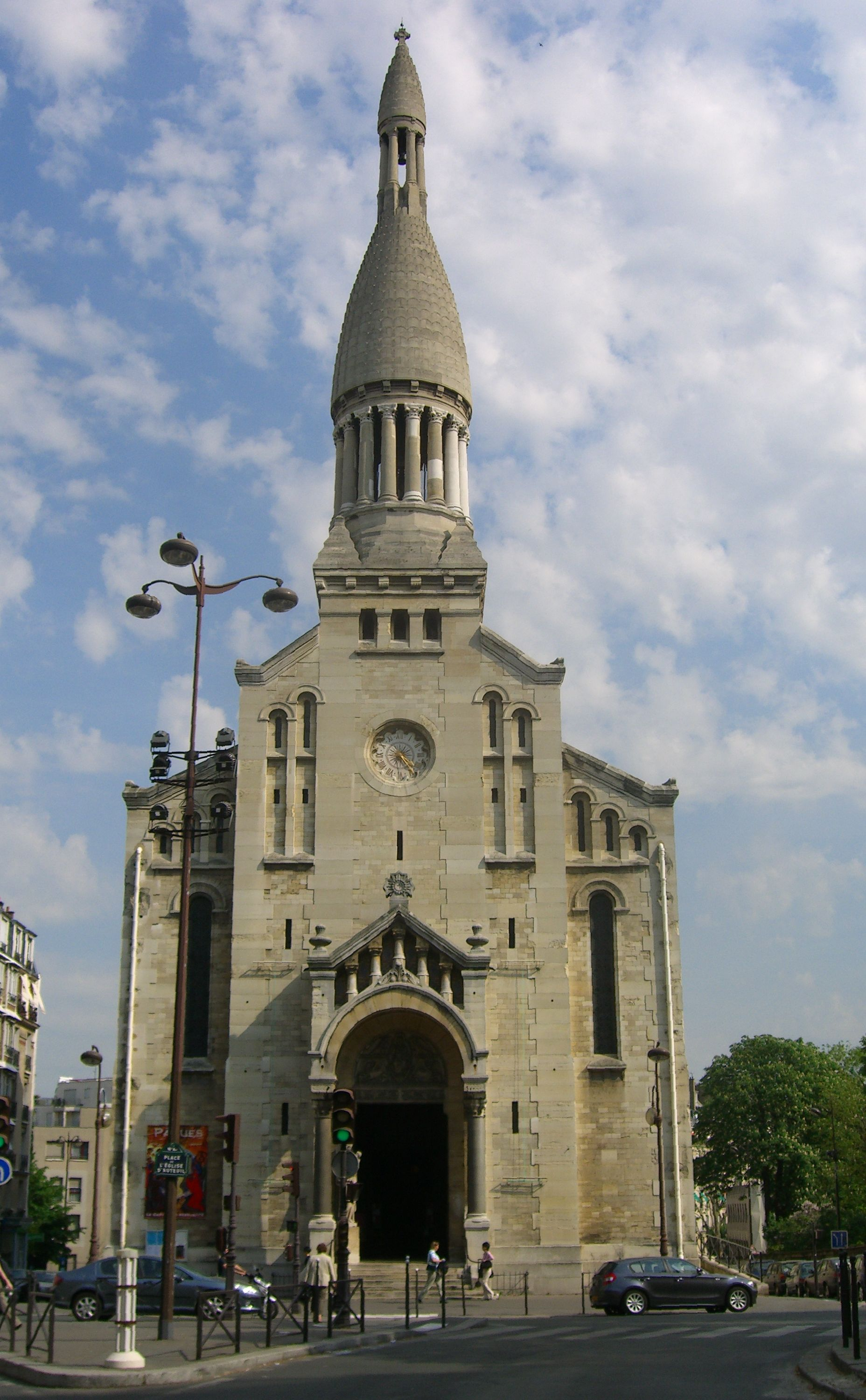
The Church of Notre-Dame d'Auteuil by Émile Vaudremer (1878–92)

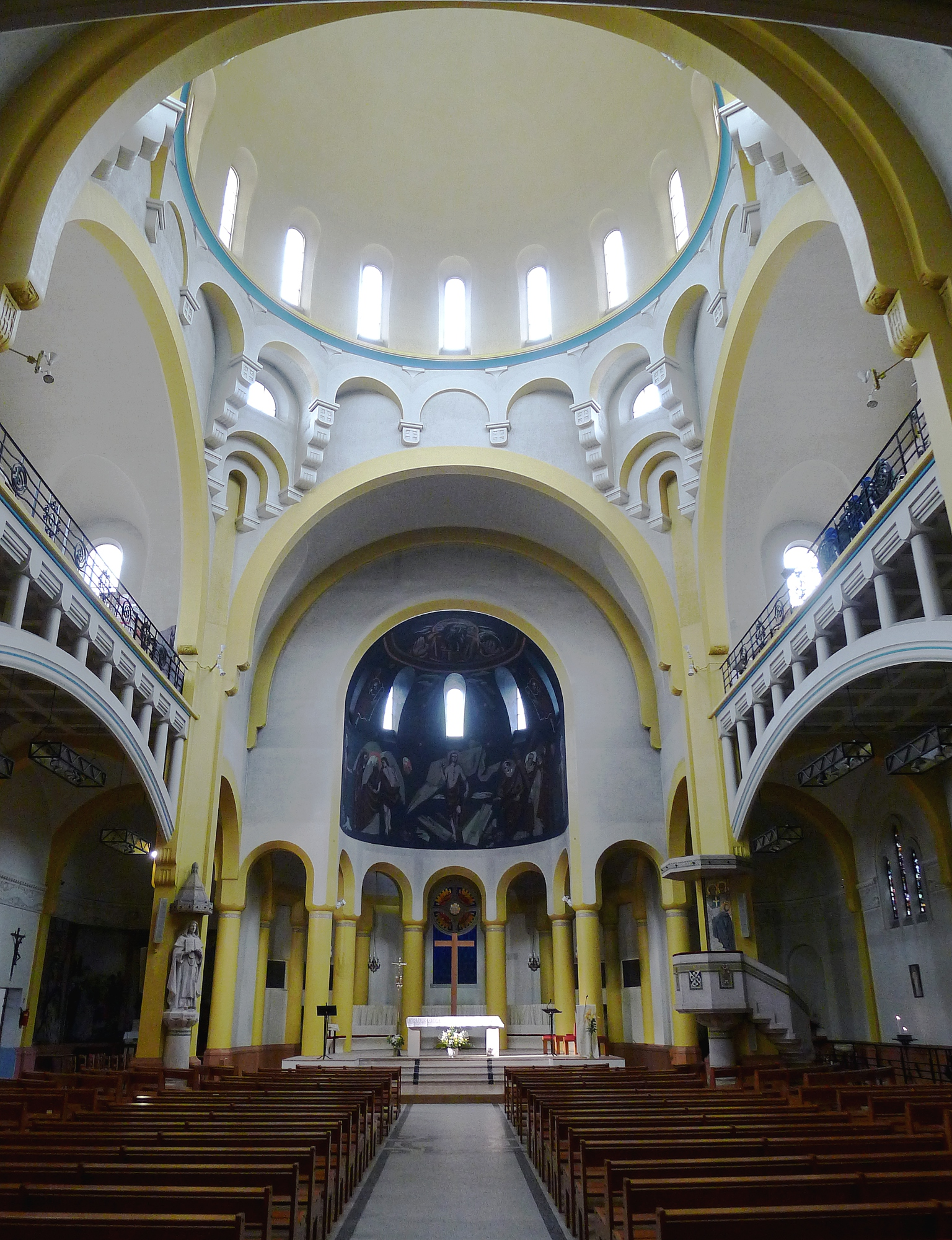
The neo-Byzantine church of Saint-Dominque, by Léon Gaudibert, (1912–25)

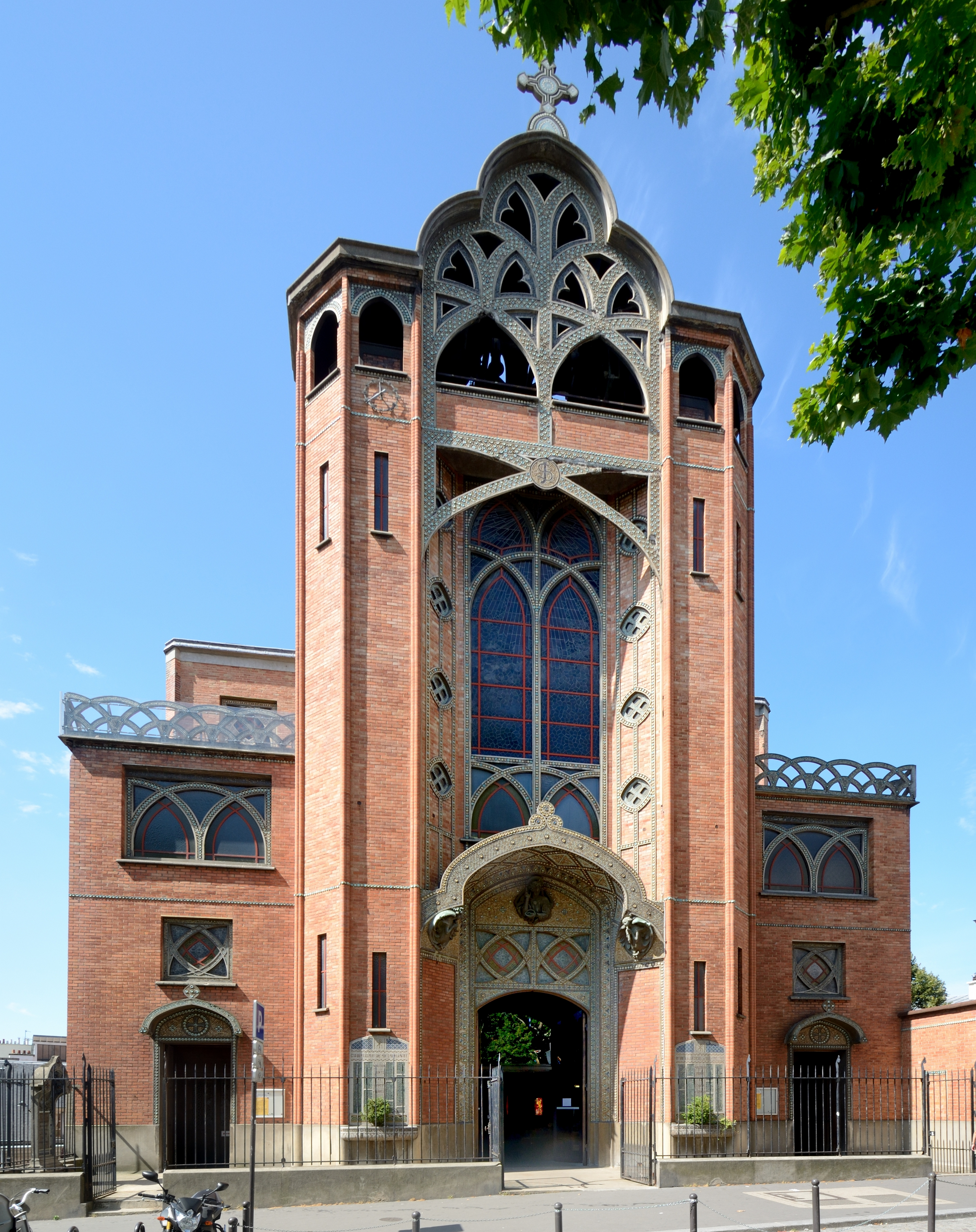
The Church of Saint-Jean-de-Montmartre, by Anatole de Baudot (1894)

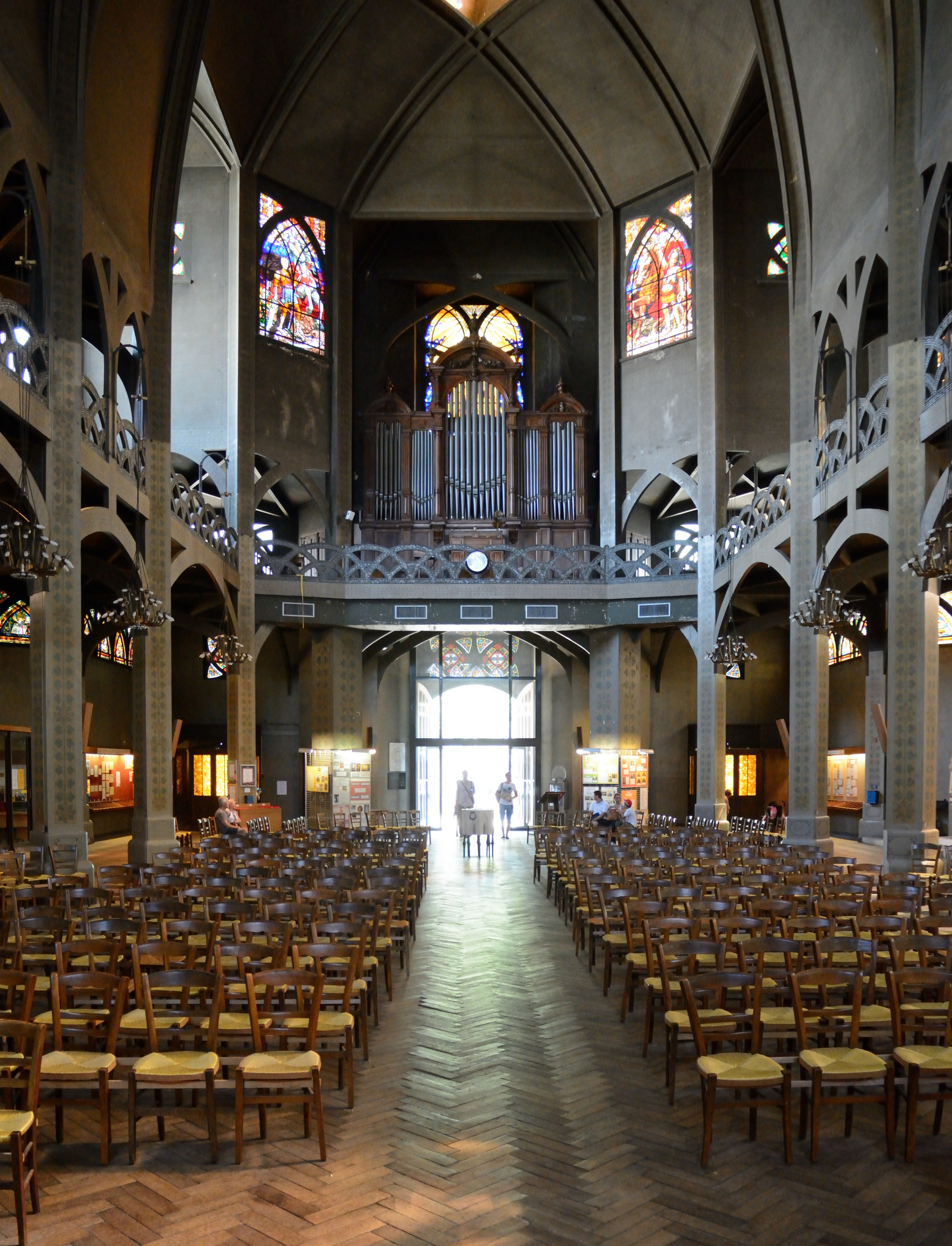
Art-Nouveau interior of Saint-Jean-de-Montmartre (1894)

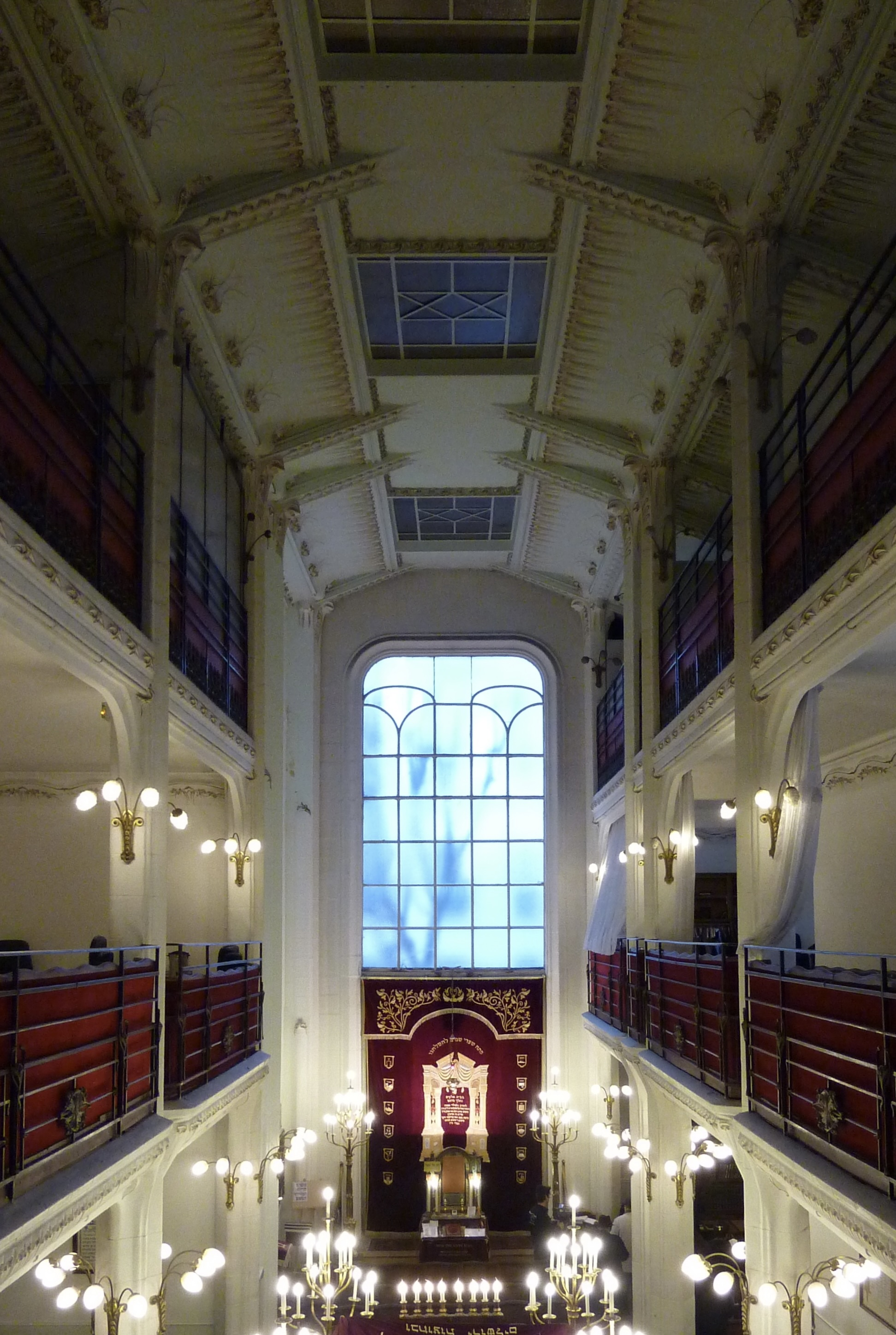
Interior of the Synagogue on Rue Pavée, by Hector Guimard, with its discreet Art Nouveau detail (1913)

From the 1870s until the 1930s the most prominent style for Paris churches was the Romano-Byzantine style; the model and most famous example was the Sacré-Cœur, by Paul Abadie, whose design won a national exposition. Its construction lasted the entire span of the Belle Epoque, between 1874 and 1913, under three different architects; it was not consecrated until 1919. It was modeled after the romanesque and Byzantine cathedrals of the early Middle Ages, which Abadie had restored. The style also appeared in the church of Notre-Dame d'Auteuil by Émile Vaudremer (1878–92) The church of Saint-Dominque, by Leon Gaudibert, (1912–25) followed the style of Byzantine churches, with a massive central dome. The first church in Paris to be constructed of reinforced concrete was Saint-Jean-de-Montmartre, at 19 rue des Abbesses at the foot of Montmartre. The architect was Anatole de Baudot, a student of Viollet-le-Duc. The nature of the revolution was not evident, because Baudot faced the concrete with brick and ceramic tiles in a colorful Art nouveau style, with stained glass windows in the same style.

=== The department store and the office building ===
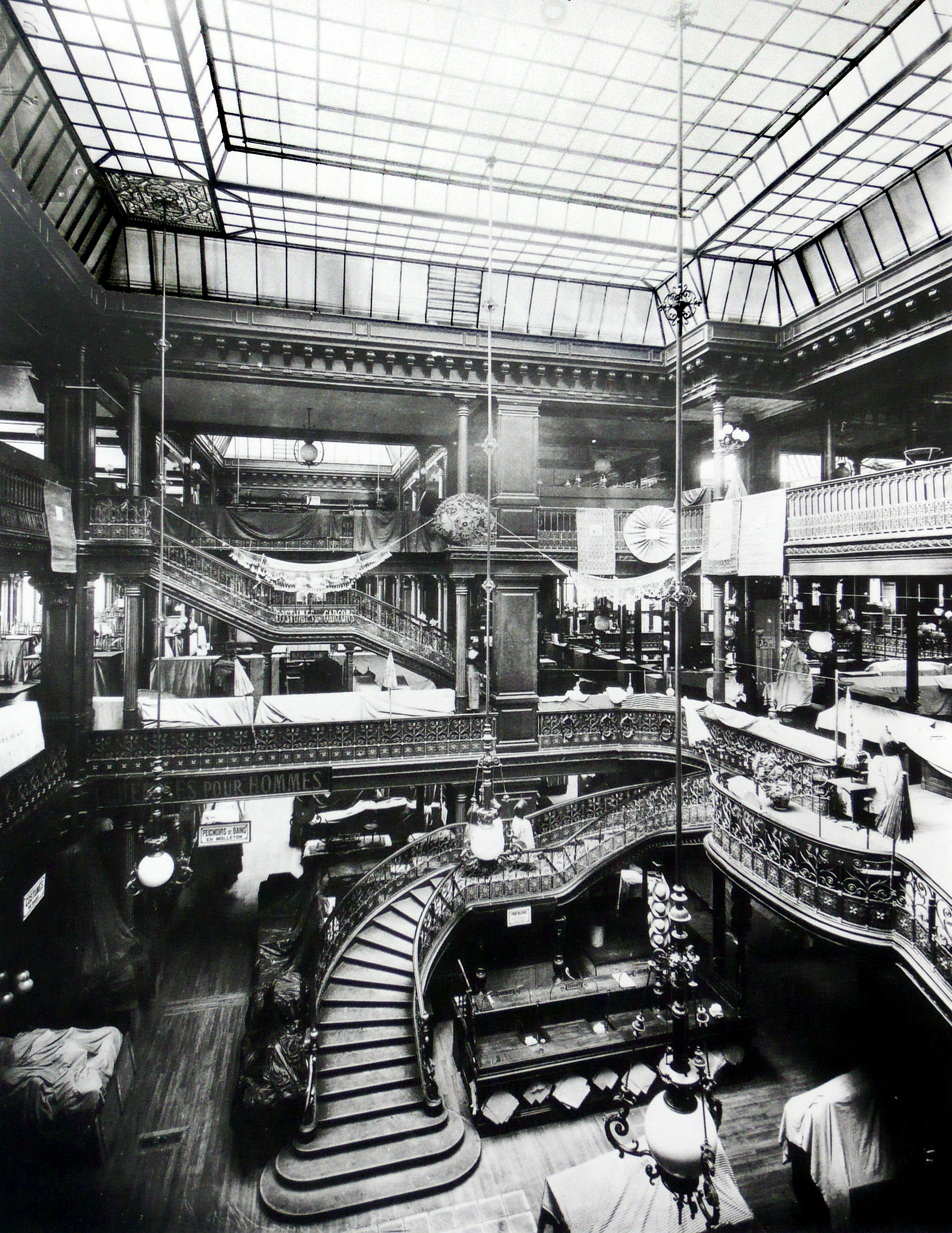
Interior of the Bon Marché department store (1875)

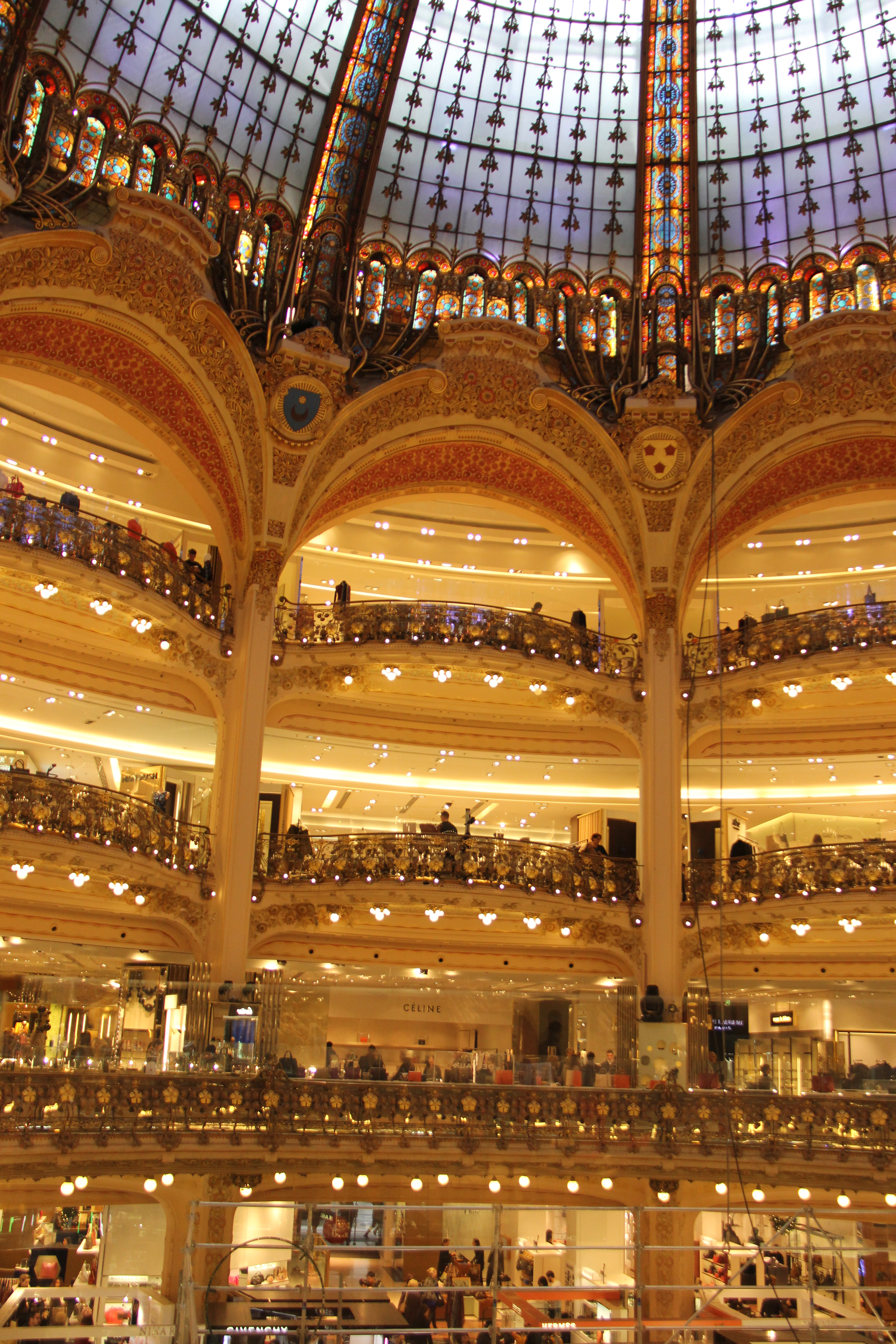
The glass cupola of the department store Galeries Lafayette (1912) provides light to the galleries below

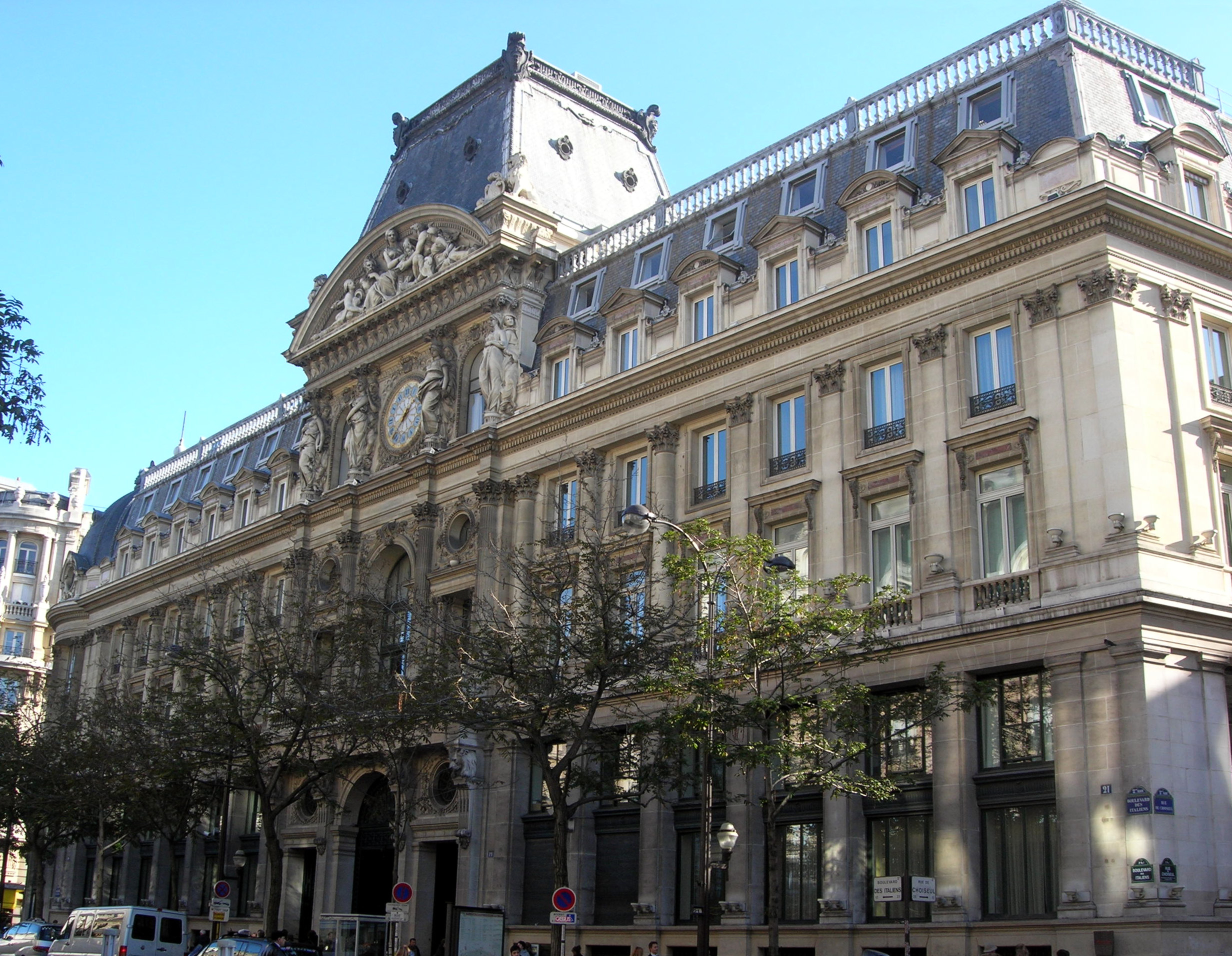
Facade of the headquarters of Crédit Lyonnais, William Bouwens Van der Boijen, in the Beaux-Arts style (1883)

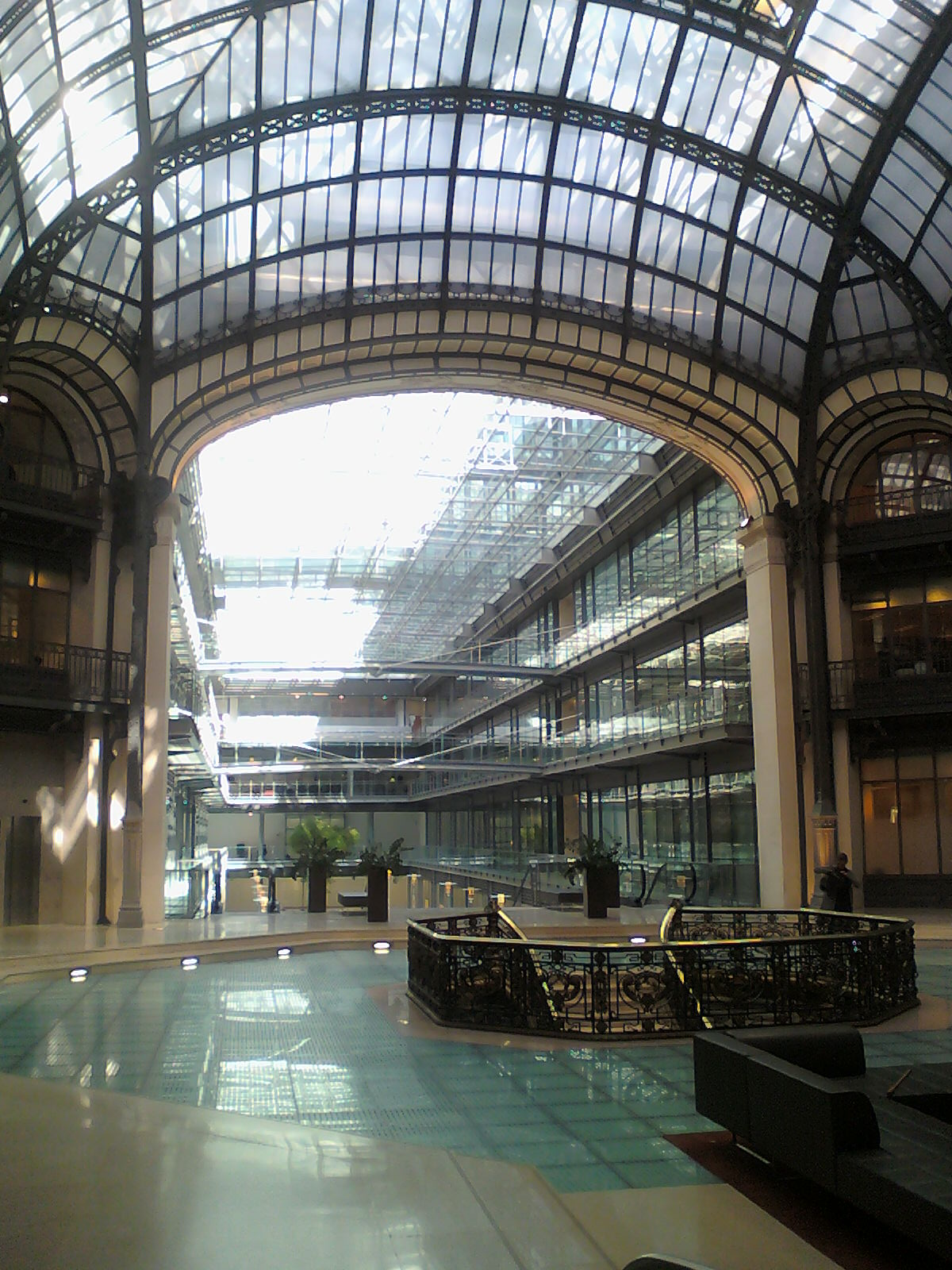
The grand gallery of the headquarters of Crédit Lyonnais at 18 rue du quatre septembre, by Victor Laloux (1907)

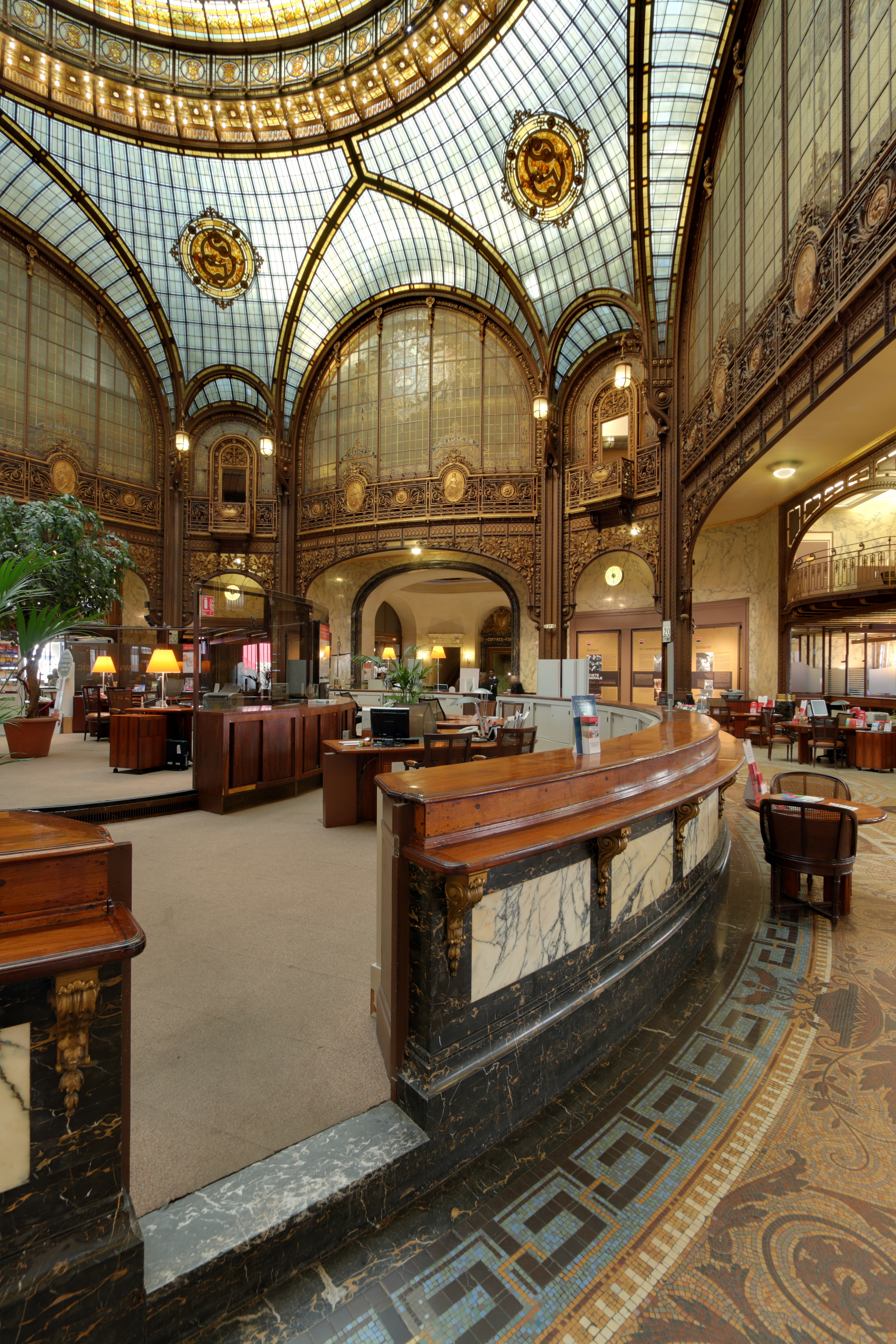
Cupola of the headquarters of Société Générale at 29 boulevard Haussmann, by Jacques Hermant (1905–11)

Aristide Boucicaut launched the first modern department store in Paris Au Bon Marché, in 1852. Within twenty years, it had 1,825 employees and an income of more than 20 million francs. In 1869 Boucicault began constructing a much larger store, with an iron frame, a central courtyard covered with a glass skylight. The architect was Louis-Charles Boileau, with assistance from the engineering firm of Gustave Eiffel. After more enlargements and modifications, the building was finished in 1887, and became the prototype for other department stores in Paris and around the world. Au Bon Marché was followed by au Louvre in 1865; the Bazar de l'Hôtel de Ville) in 1866, Au Printemps in 1865; La Samaritaine in 1870, and Galeries Lafayette in 1895. All the new stores glass skylights whenever possible to fill the stores with natural light, and designed the balconies around the central courts to provide the maximum of light to each section. Between 1903 and 1907 the architect Frantz Jourdain created the interior and façades of the new building of La Samaritaine.

The safety elevator had been invented in 1852 by Elisha Otis, making tall office buildings practical, and the first skyscraper, the Home Insurance Building, a ten-story building with a steel frame, had been built in Chicago by Louis Sullivan in 1893–94, but Paris architects and clients showed little interest in building tall office buildings. Paris was already the banking and financial capital of the continent, and moreover, as of 1889 it had the tallest structure in the world, the Eiffel Tower. While some Paris architects visited Chicago to see what has happening, no clients wanted to change the familiar skyline of Paris.

The new office buildings of the Belle Époque often made use of steel, plate glass, elevators and other new architectural technologies, but they were hidden inside sober neoclassical stone façades, and the buildings matched the height of the other buildings on Haussmann's boulevards. The headquarters of the bank Crédit Lyonnais, built in 1883 on the boulevard des Italiens in 1883 by William Bouwens Van der Boijen, was in the Beaux-Arts style on the outside, but inside one of the most modern buildings of its time, using an iron frame and glass skylight to provide ample light to large hall where the title deeds were held. In 1907 the building was updated with a new entrance at 15 rue du Quatre-Septembre, designed by Victor Laloux, who also designed the Gare d'Orsay, now the Musée d'Orsay The new entrance featured a striking rotunda with a glass dome over a floor of glass bricks, which allowed the daylight to illuminate the level below, and the three other levels below. The entrance was badly damaged by a fire in 1996; the rotunda was restored, but the only a few elements still remain of the titles hall.

=== Railway stations ===
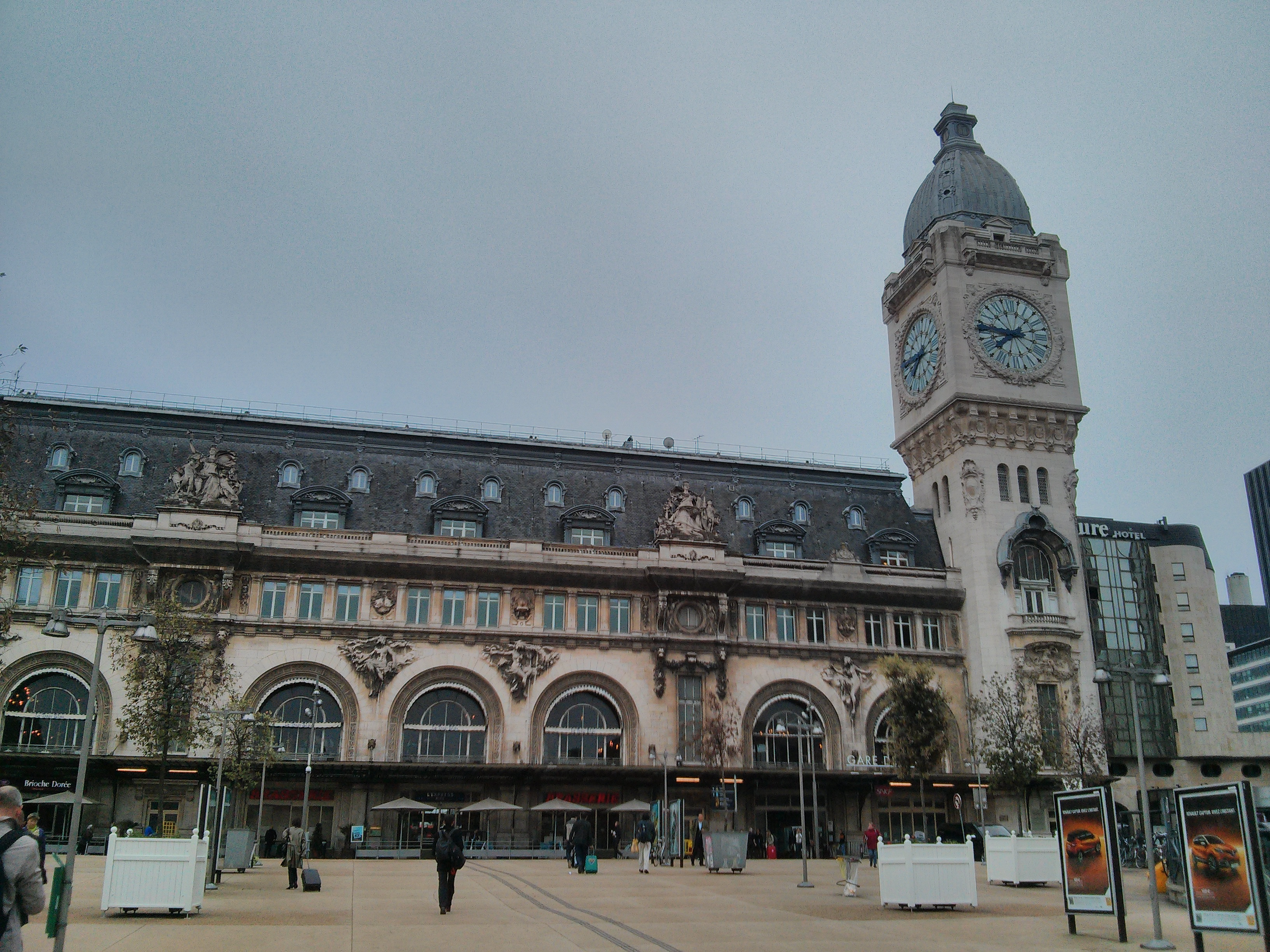
Gare de Lyon, by architect Marius Toudoire (1895–1902).

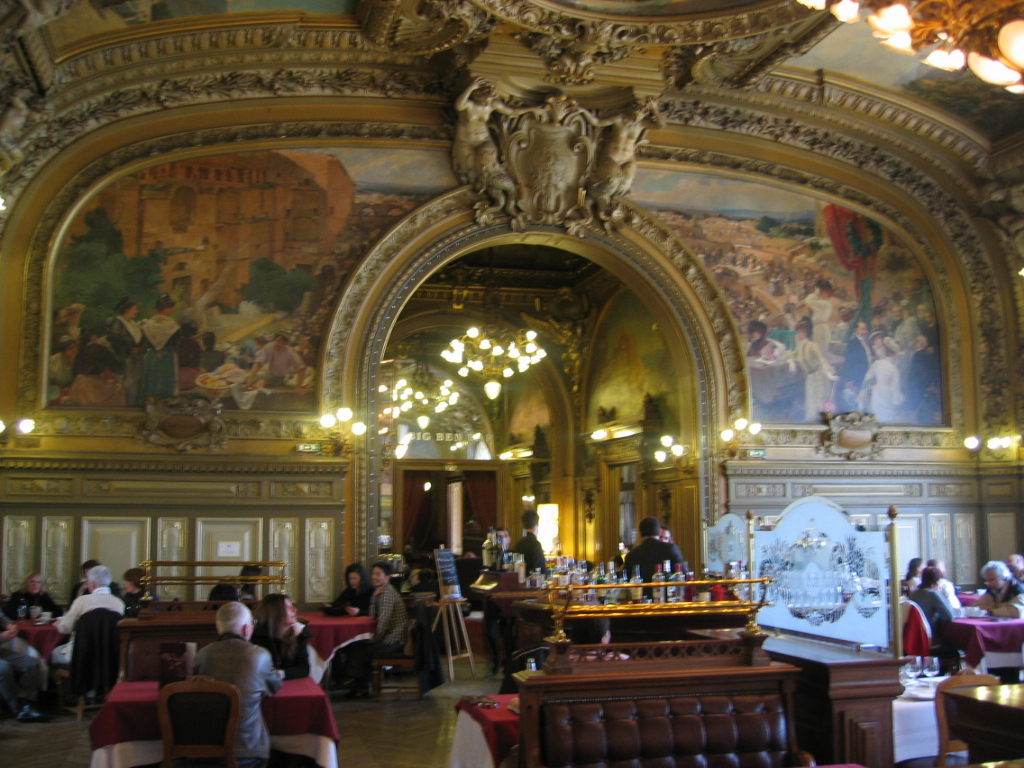
The Train Bleu café in the Gare de Lyon, in the ornate Belle Époque style (1902)

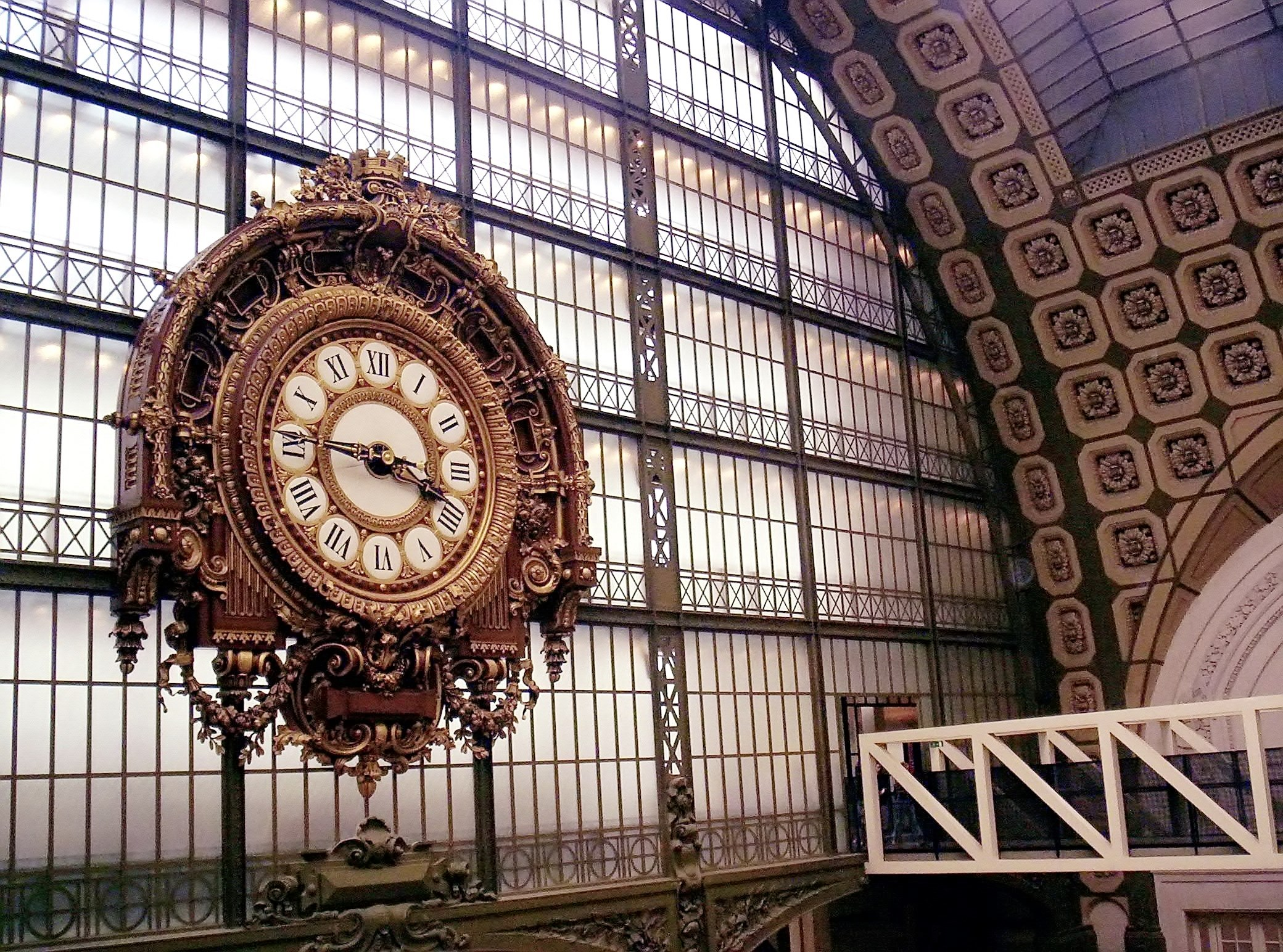
The clock of the Gare d'Orsay, by Victor Laloux

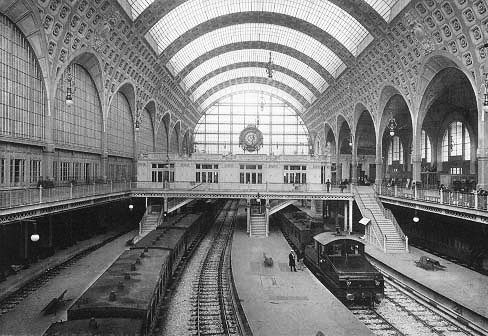
Interior of the Gare d'Orsay (now the Musée d'Orsay) in about 1900.

The Belle Époque was the golden age of the Paris railway station; they served as the gateways of the city for the visitors who arrived for the great Expositions. A new Gare de Lyon was built by Marius Toudoire between 1895 and 1902, making the maximum use of glass and iron combined with a picturesque bell tower and Beaux-Arts façade and decoration. The café of the station looked down on the platform where the trains arrived. The Gare d'Orsay (now the Musée d'Orsay was the first station in the center of the city, on the site of the old Ministry of Finance, burned by the Paris Commune. It was built in 1898–1900 in the palatial Beaux-Arts style by architect Victor Laloux. It was the first Paris station to be electrified and to place the train platforms below street level, a model soon copied by New York and other cities.

=== Residential architecture – Beaux-Arts to Art Nouveau ===
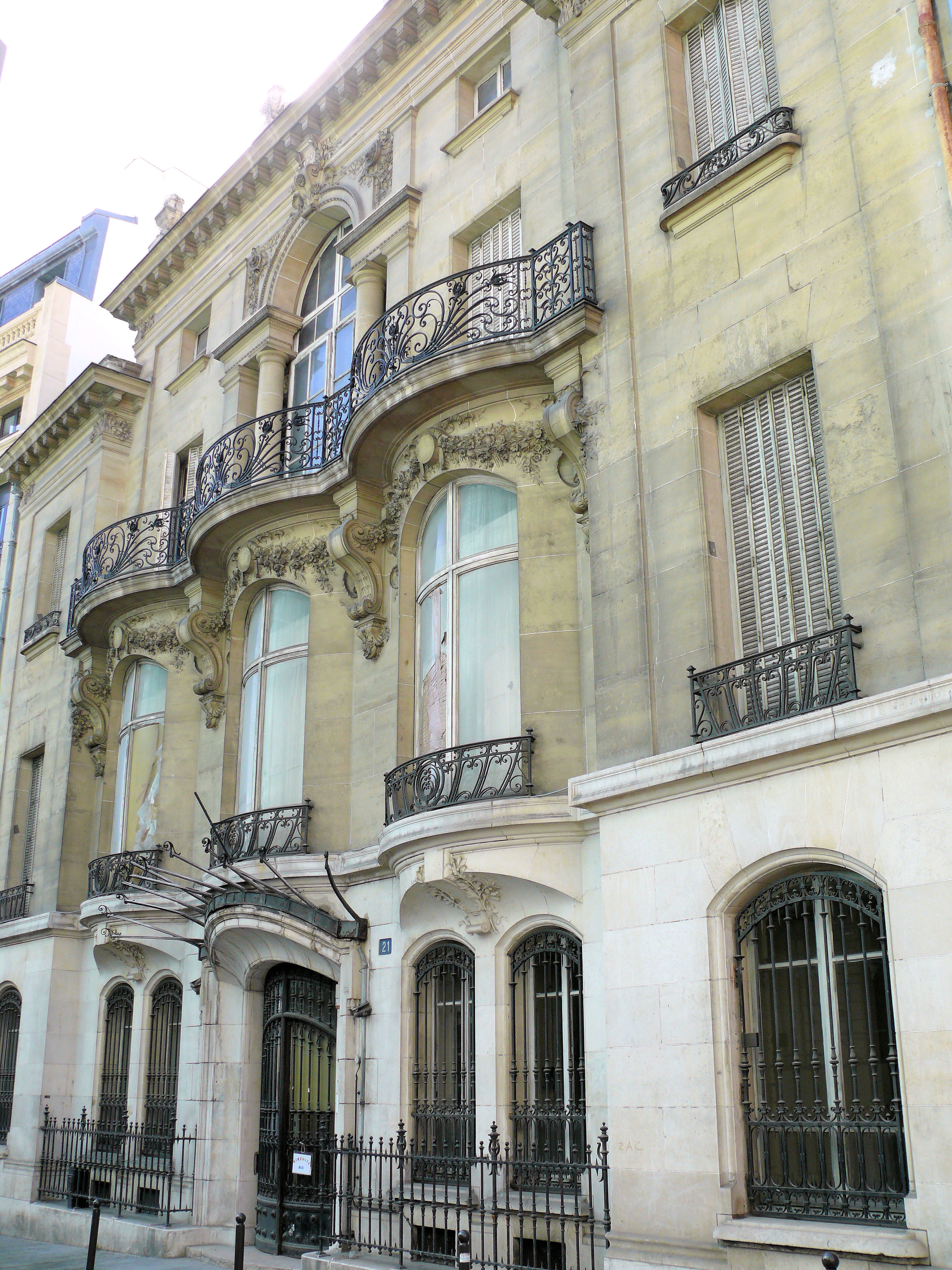
The Hôtel de Choudens, (1901), by Charles Girault

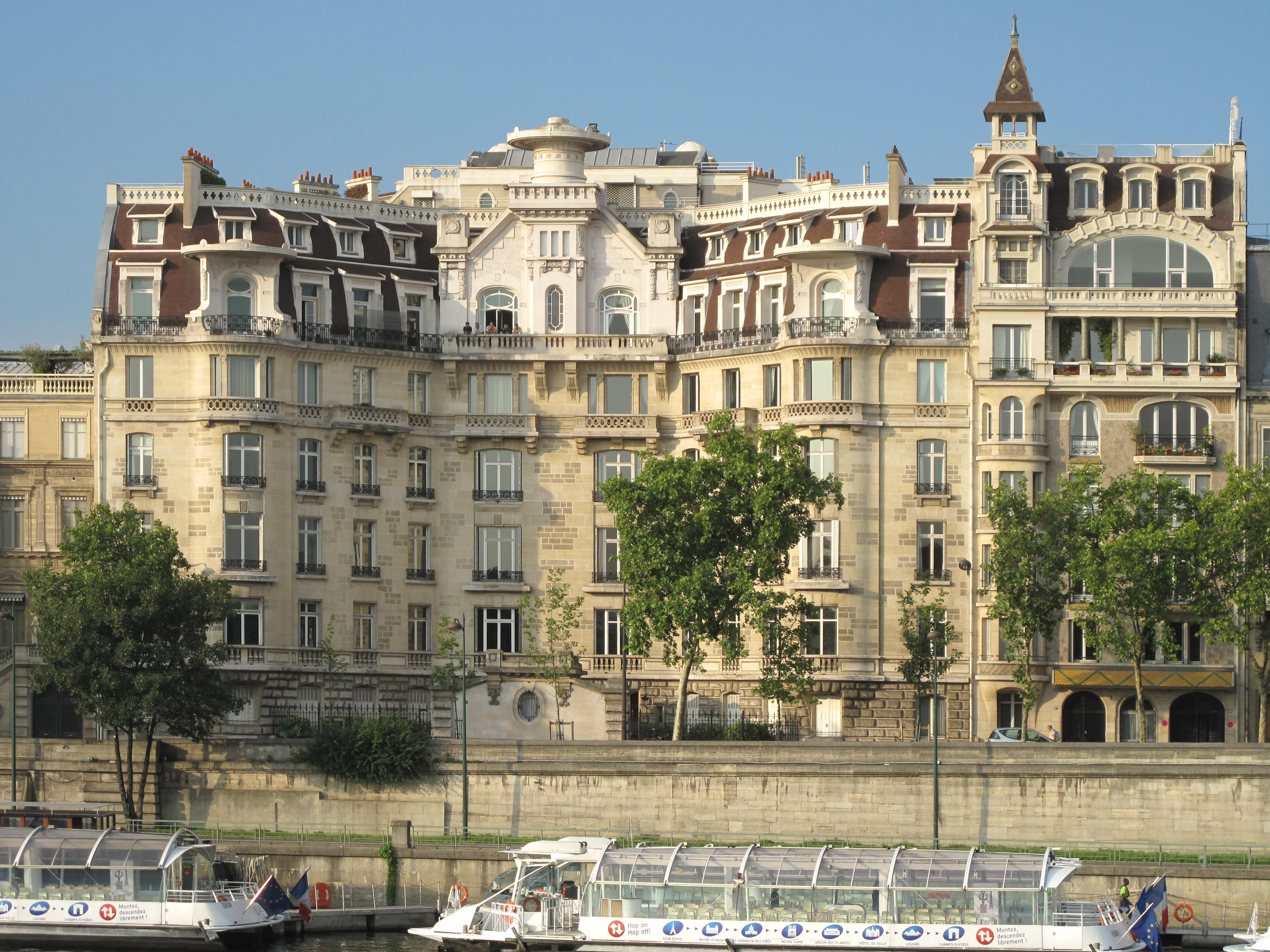
27–29 quai Anatole-France (7th arr.) by Richard Bouwens van der Boijen (1906)

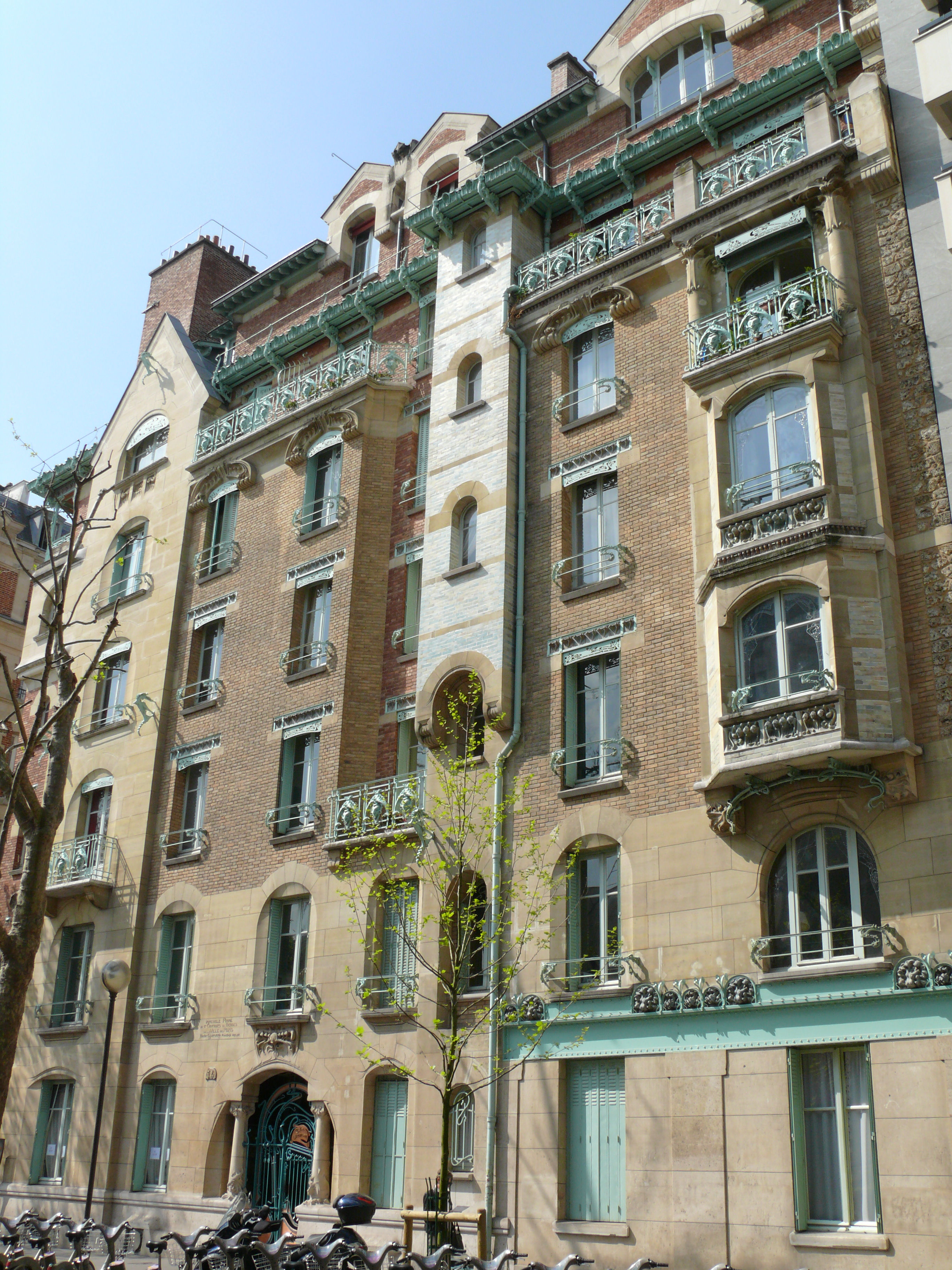
The Castel Béranger by Hector Guimard (1899)

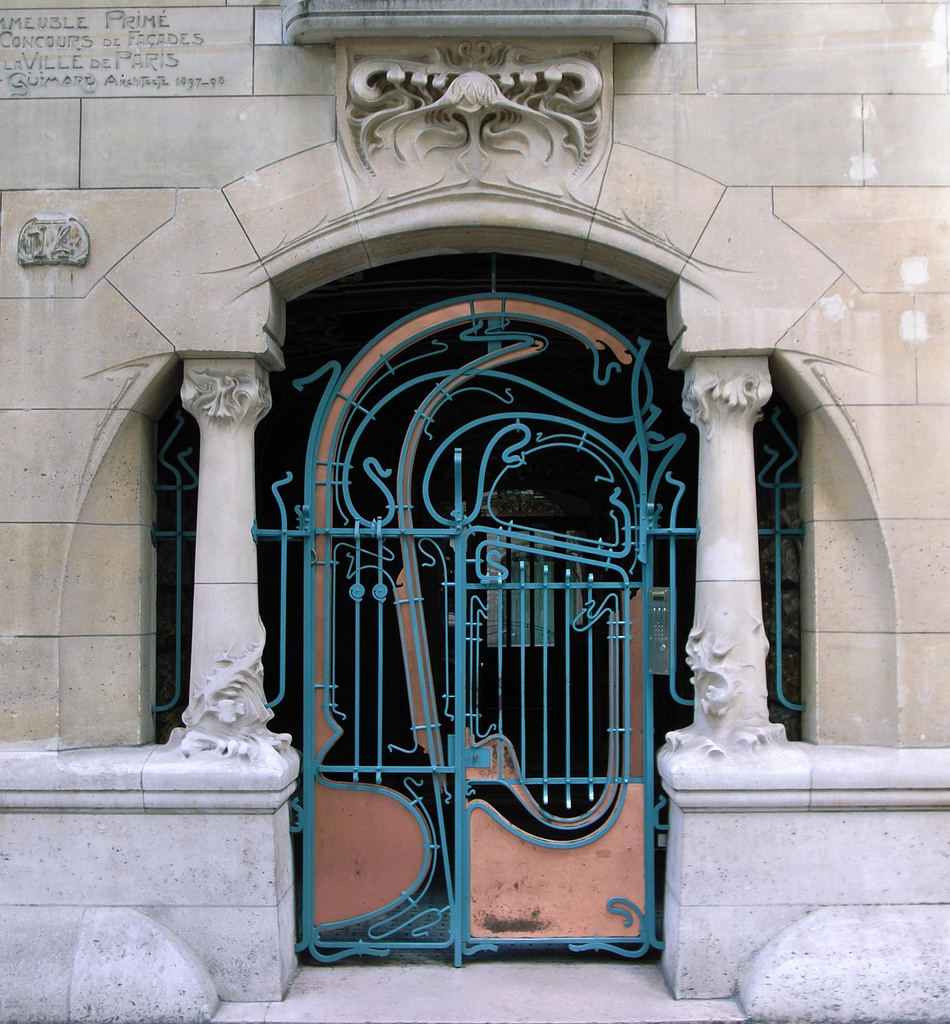
Entrance of the Castel Beranger

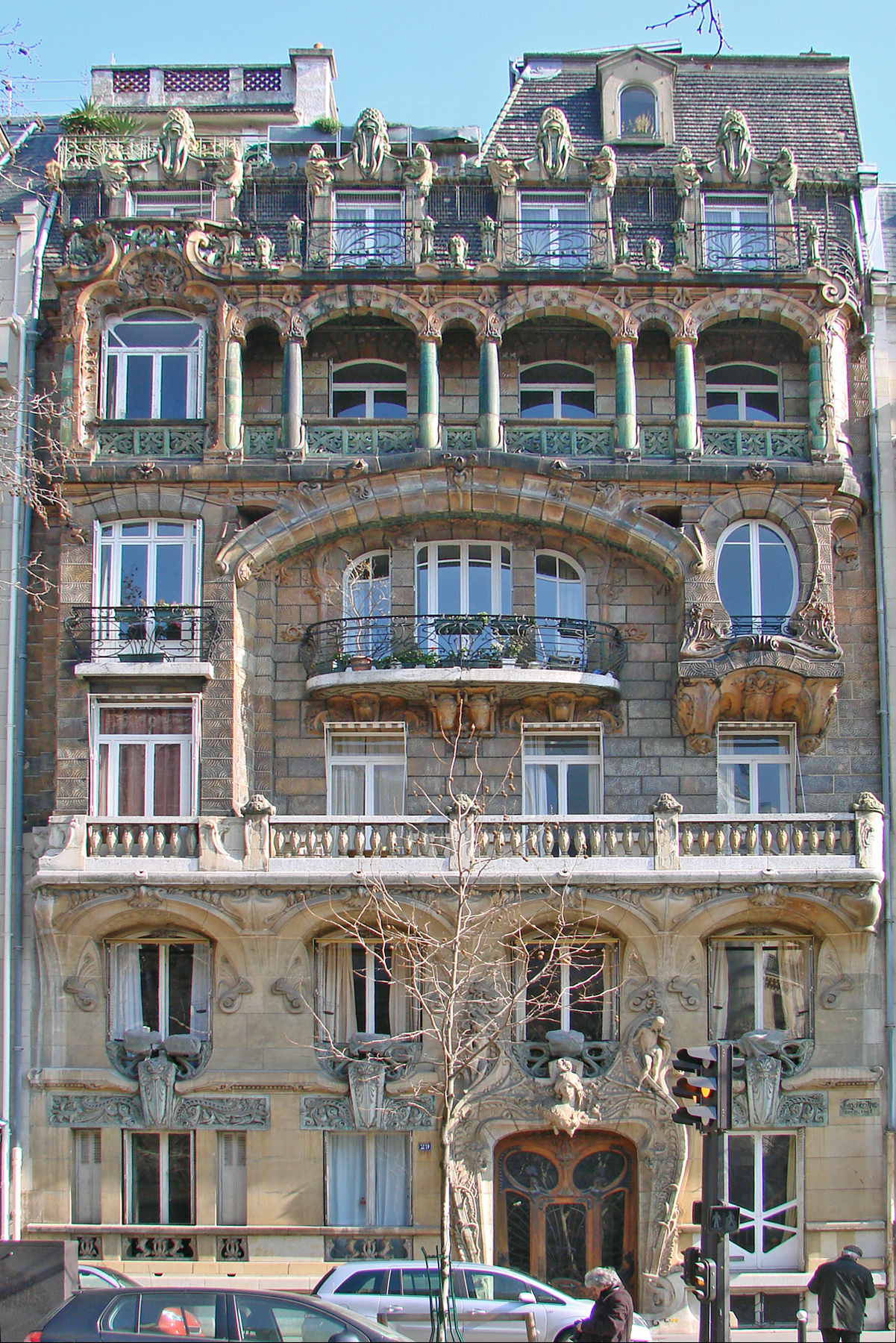
Lavirotte Building by Jules Lavirotte at 29 Avenue Rapp (1901)

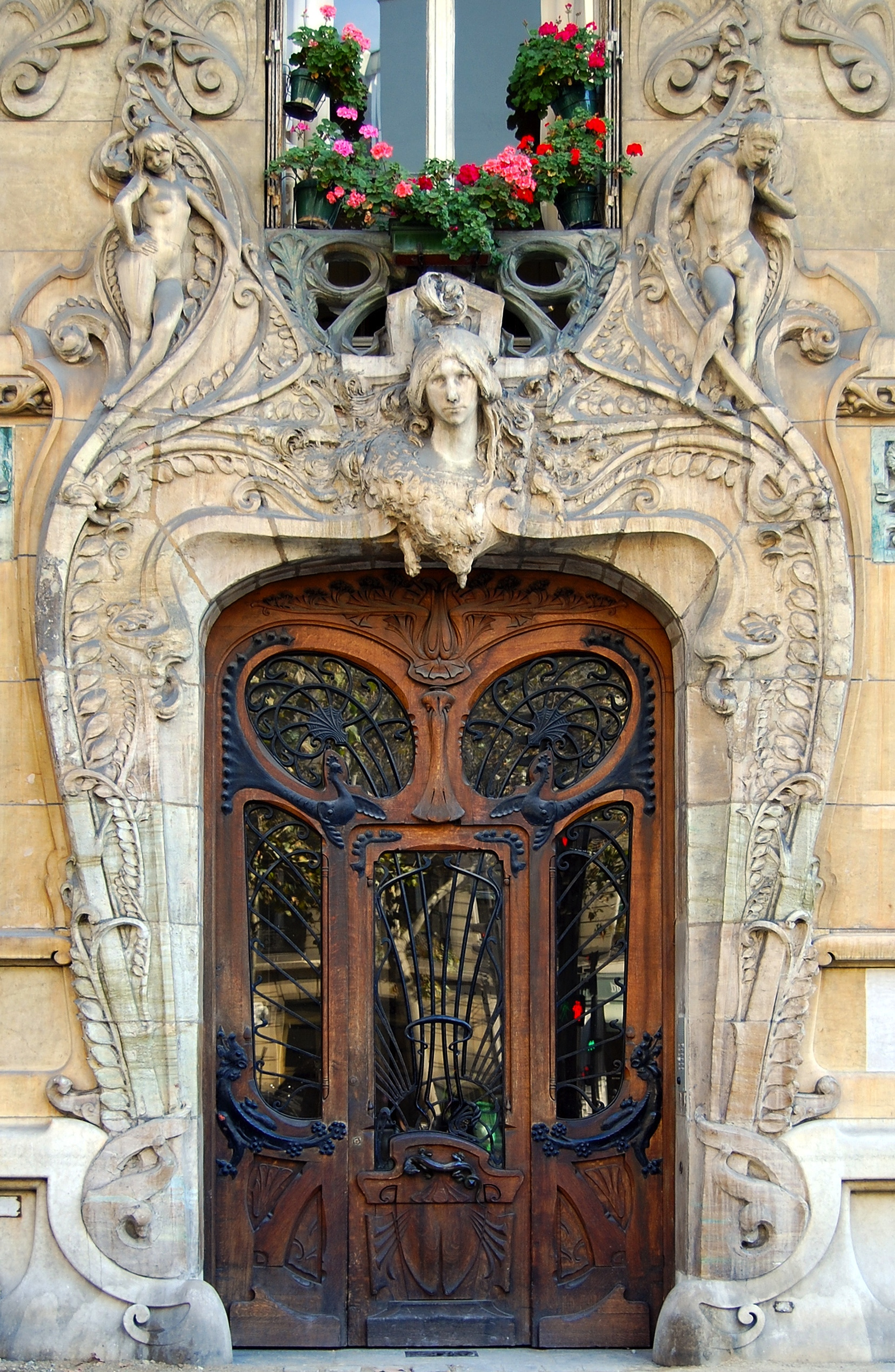
Entrance to building by Jules Lavirotte at 29 Avenue Rapp

Private houses and apartment buildings in the Belle Époque were usually in the Beaux-Arts style, either neo-Renaissanace or neoclassical, or a mixture of the two. A good example is the Hôtel de Choudens (1901) by Charles Girault, built for a client who wanted a house in the style of the Petit Palais, which Giraud had designed. Apartment buildings saw changes in the interiors; with the development of elevators, the apartment of the wealthiest residents moved from the first floor above the street to the top floor. The rooflines of the new apartment buildings also changed, as the city removed the restrictions imposed by Haussmann; the most extravagant example was the apartment building at 27–29 quai Anatole-France in 7th arrondissement (1906), which sprouted profusion of turrets, spires and decorative arches, made possible by reinforced concrete.

A competition for new façades was held in 1898, and one winner was Hector Guimard for the design of a new apartment building, the Castel Béranger (1895–98), the first Paris building in the Art Nouveau style. The façade was inspired by the work of the Belgian Art Nouveau pioneer Victor Horta; it used both elements of medieval architecture and curved motifs inspired by plants and flowers. Horta designed every detail of the house, including furniture, wallpaper, door handles and locks. The success of the Castel Beranger led to Guimard's selection to design the entrance of stations of the new Paris Métro. In 1901, the façade competition was won more extravagant architect, Jules Lavirotte, who designed a house for the ceramic maker Alexandre Bigot which was more a work of inhabited sculpture than a building. The façade was entirely covered with decorative ceramic sculpture. The popularity of Art Nouveau did not last long; the last Paris building in the style was Guimard's own house, the Hôtel Guimard at 122 Avenue Mozart (1909–13).

== Between the wars - Art Deco and modernism (1919–1939) ==
=== Art Deco ===
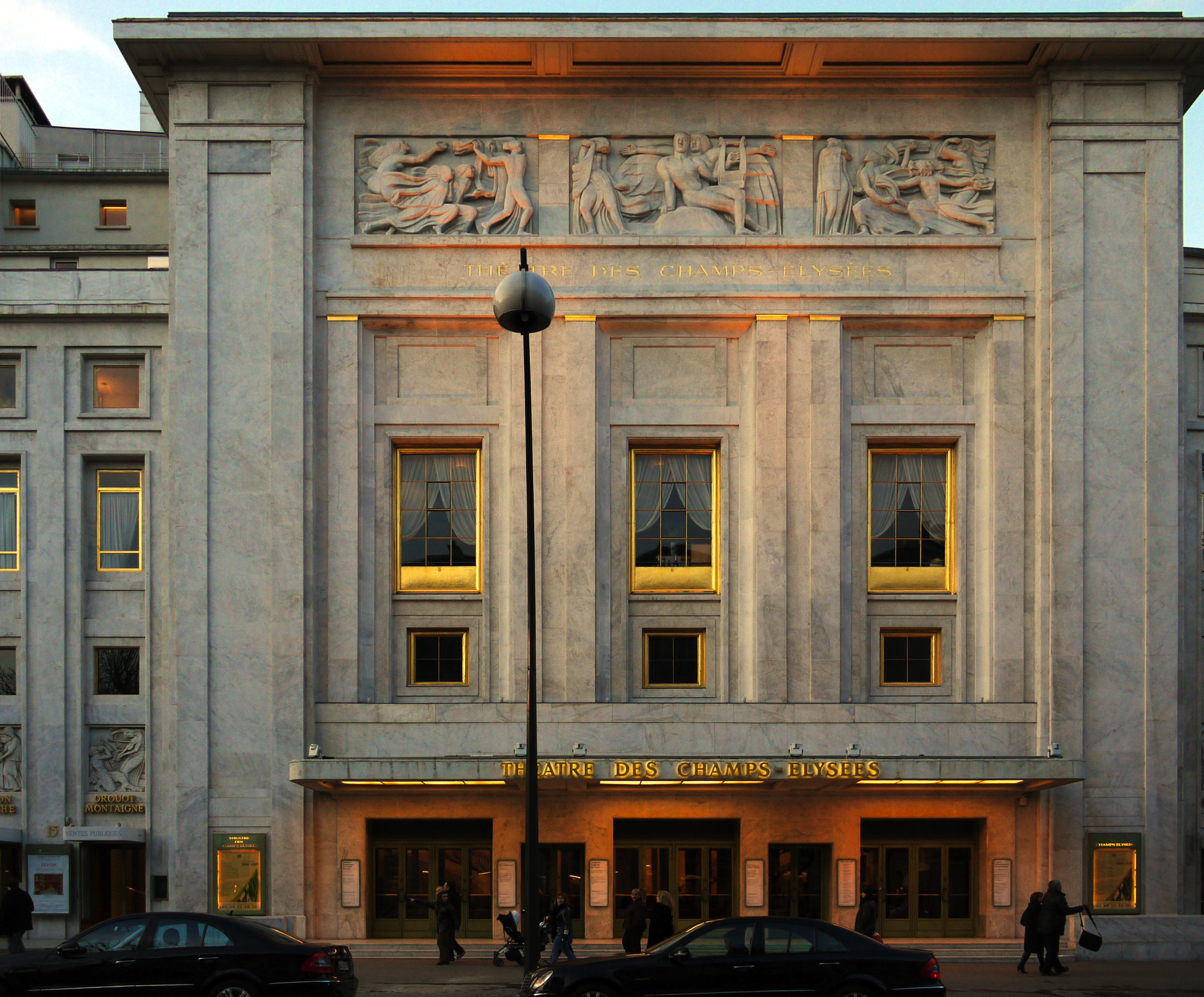
The Théâtre des Champs-Élysées in the Art Deco style, by Auguste Perret (1911–12)

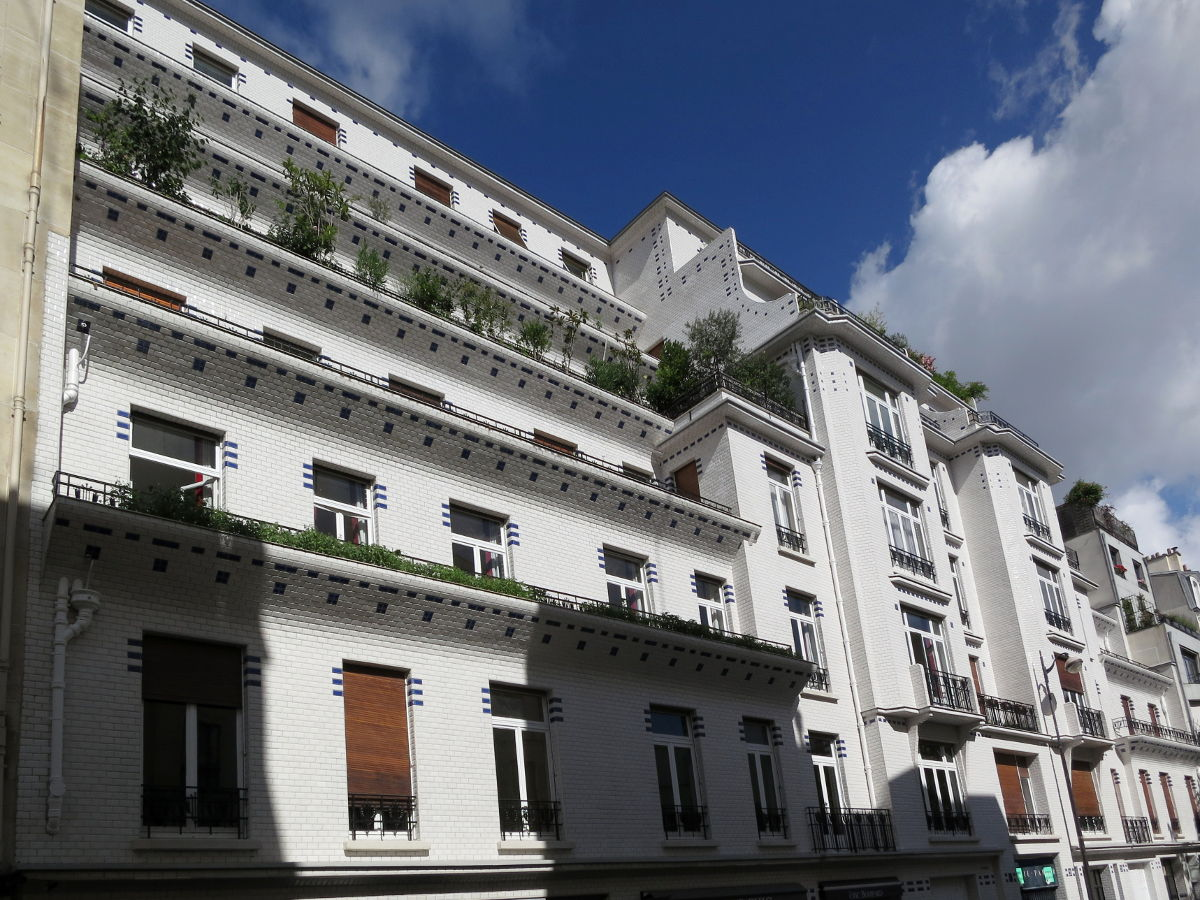
Apartment house at 26 Rue Vavin (6th arrondissement) by Henri Sauvage (1913)

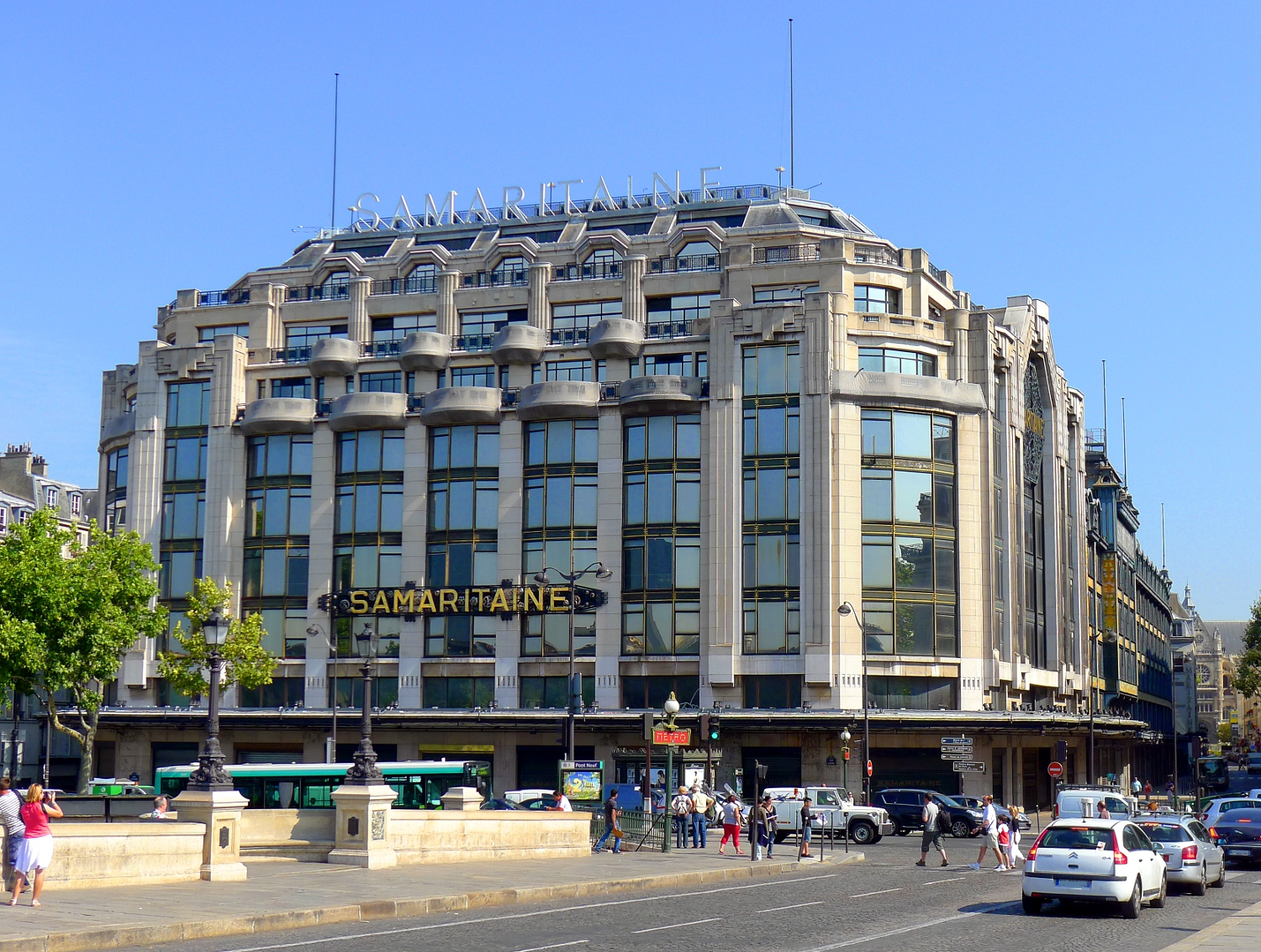
La Samaritaine department store, by Henri Sauvage, Paris (1925–1928)

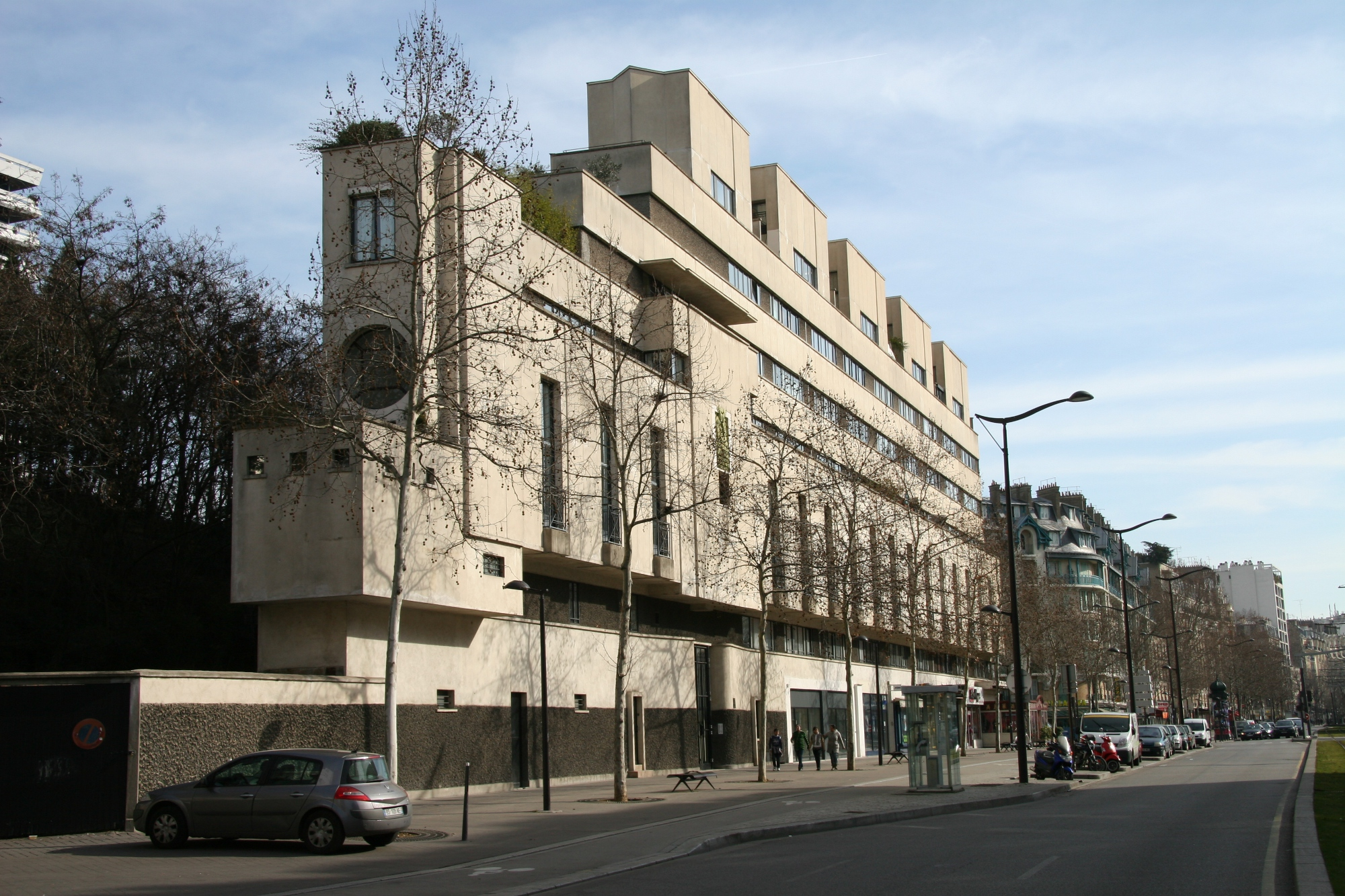
Building in the Pacquebot or ocean liner style, 3 boulevard Victor (15th arrondissement), (1935)

The Art Nouveau had its moment of glory in Paris beginning in 1898, but was out of fashion by 1914. The Art Deco, which appeared just before the war, became the dominant style for major buildings between the wars. The primary building material of the new era was reinforced concrete. The structure of the buildings was clearly expressed on the exterior, and was dominated by horizontal lines, with rows of bow windows and small balconies. They often had classical features, such as rows of columns, but these were expressed in a stark modern form; ornament was kept to a minimum, and statuary and ornament was often applied, as a carved stone plaque on the façade, rather than expressed in the architecture of the building itself.

The leading proponents of the Art Deco were Auguste Perret and Henri Sauvage. Perret designed the Théâtre des Champs-Élysées, the first Art Deco building in Paris, in 1913, just before the War. His major achievements between the wars were the building for the Mobilier National (1936) and the Museum of Public Works (1939), now the Economic and Social Council, located on place d'Iéna, with its giant rotunda and columns inspired by ancient Egypt. Sauvage expanded the La Samaritaine department store in 1931, preserving elements of the Art Nouveau interior and façades, while giving it an Art Deco form. He experimented with new, simpler forms of apartment buildings, including the stepped building, creating terraces for the upper floors, and covered concrete surfaces with white ceramic tile, resembling stone. He also was a pioneer in the use of prefabricated building materials, reducing costs and construction time.

A related Paris fashion between the wars was the Style paquebot, buildings that resembled the ocean liners of the period, with sleek white façades, rounded corners, white façades, and nautical railings. They often were built on narrow pieces of land, or on corners. One example is the building at 3 boulevard Victor in the 15th arrondissement, built in 1935.

=== Exposition architecture ===
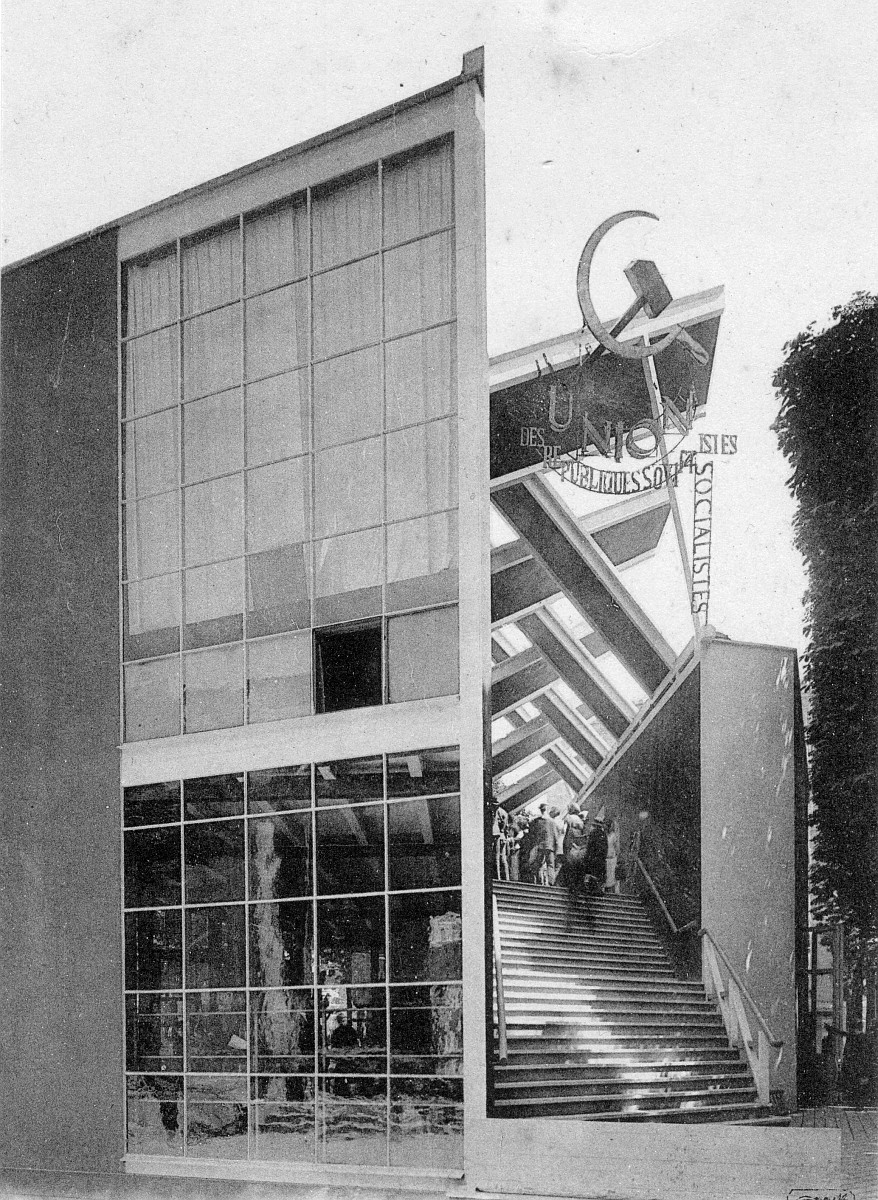
Pavillon of the Soviet Union from the 1925 Exposition of Decorative Arts, in the Constructivist style

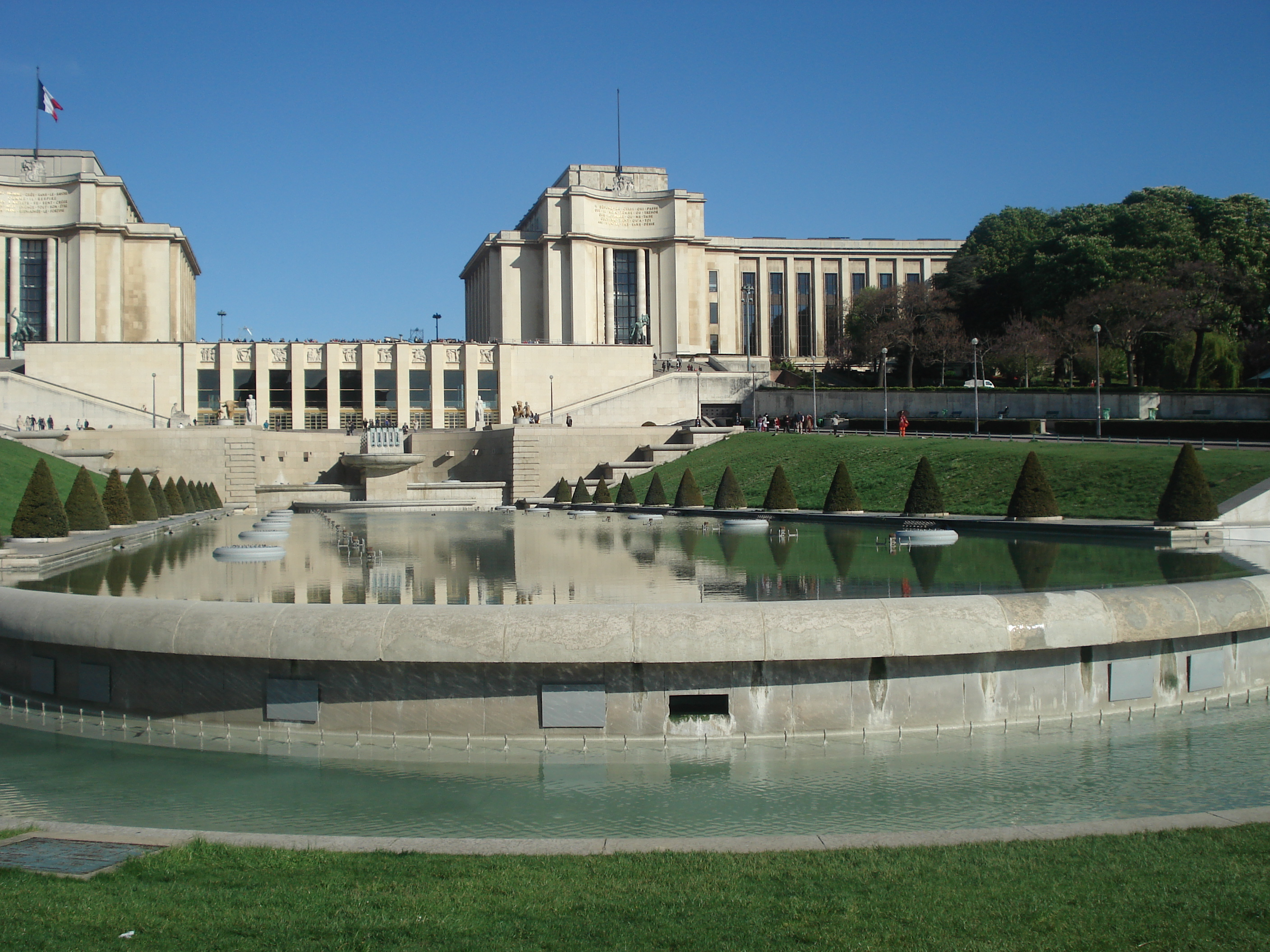
The Palais de Chaillot from the 1937 Paris International Exposition

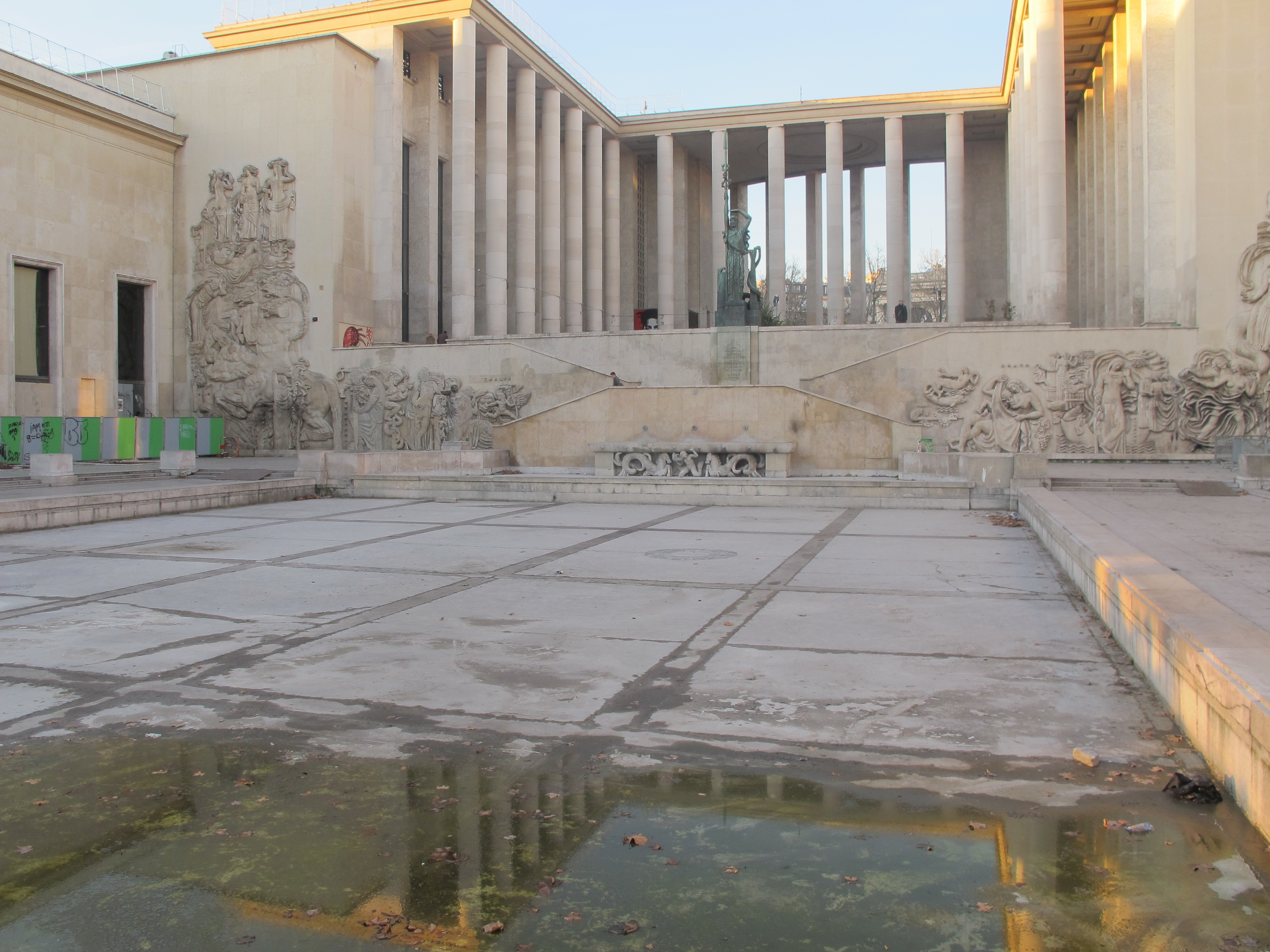
The Palais de Tokyo, built for the 1937 Exposition, is now the museum of modern art of the city of Paris

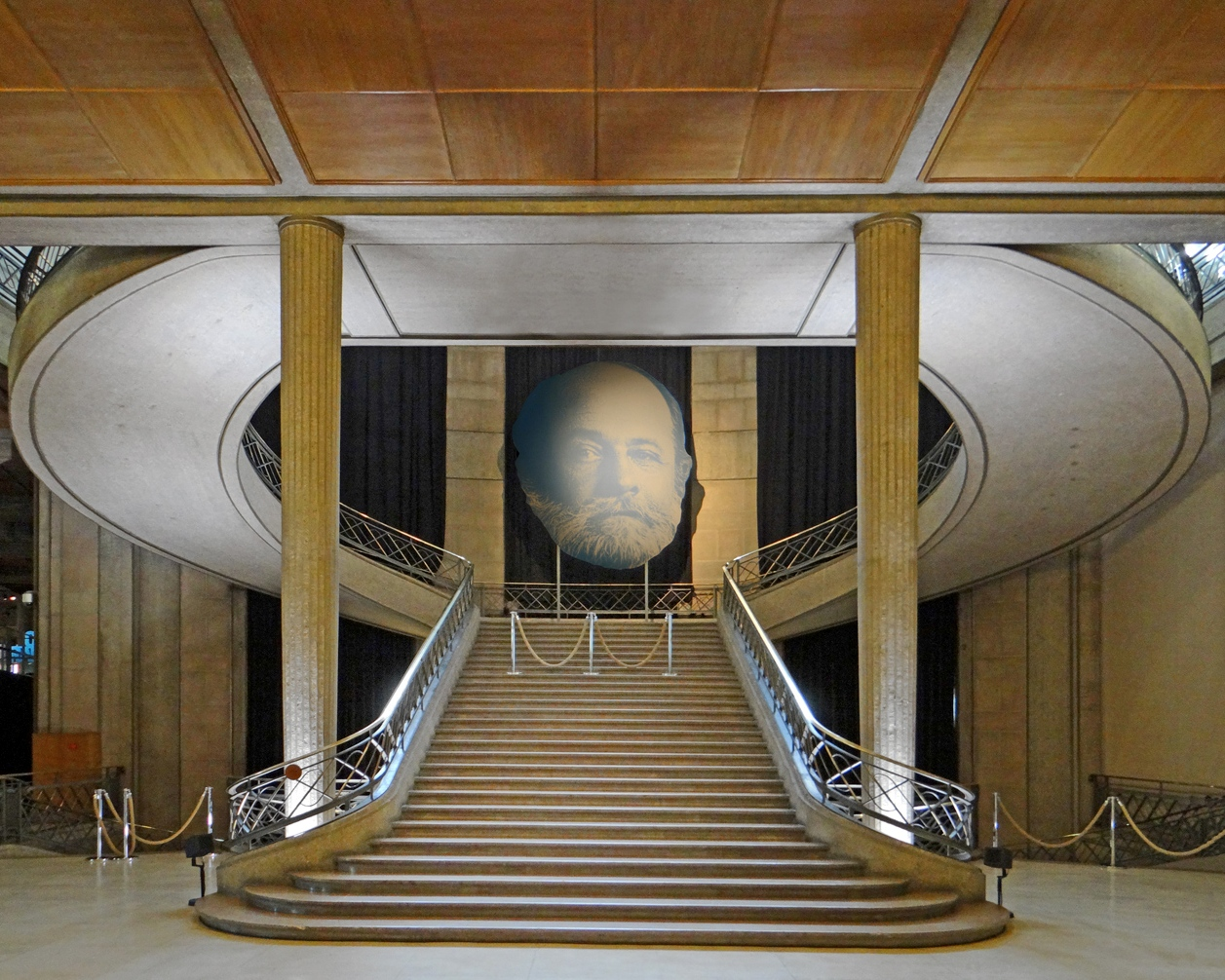
Grand stairway of the French Economic, Social and Environmental Council, built for the 1937 Exposition by Auguste Perret (1934–1948)

The international expositions of the 1920s and 1930s left fewer architectural landmarks than the earlier exhibitions. The 1925 International Exhibition of Modern Decorative and Industrial Arts had several very modern buildings, the Russian pavilions, the Art Deco Hôtel du collectionneur by Émile-Jacques Ruhlmann, and the Pavillon d'Esprit by Le Corbusier, but they were all torn down when the exhibit ended. One impressive Art Deco building from the 1934 Colonial Exposition survived; the Museum of the Colonies at la Port Doréé, by Albert Laprade, 89 meters long, with a colonnade and a front wall entirely covered with a bas-relief by Alfred Janniot on the animals, plants, and cultures the theme the cultures of the French colonies. The interior was filled with sculpture and murals from the period, still visible today. Today, the building is the Cité nationale de l'histoire de l'immigration, or museum of the history of immigration.

The Paris International Exposition of 1937, held on the eve of World War II, was not a popular success; its two largest national pavilions were those of Nazi Germany and Soviet Russia, facing each other across the central esplanade. The chief architectural legacies were the Palais de Chaillot, where the old Palais de Trocadero had been, by Jacques Carlu, Louis Hippolyte Boileau and Léon Azéma, (1935–37), built of concrete and beige stone, and the Palais de Iena, facing it. Both were built in a monumental neoclassical style. The nearby Palais de Tokyo was another exhibit legacy, designed by André Auber, Jean-Claude Dondel, Paul Viard and Marcel Dastugue (1934–1937), in a similar neoclassic style, with a colonnade. It is now the modern art museum of the city of Paris. Another exhibit legacy is the former Museum of Public Works (1936–1948) at Place and Avenue Iena, by Auguste Perret. It contains an impressive rotunda and conference hall with a neoclassical façade, all built of reinforced concrete. After the War it was converted into the headquarters of the French Economic, Social and Environmental Council.

=== Residential architecture ===
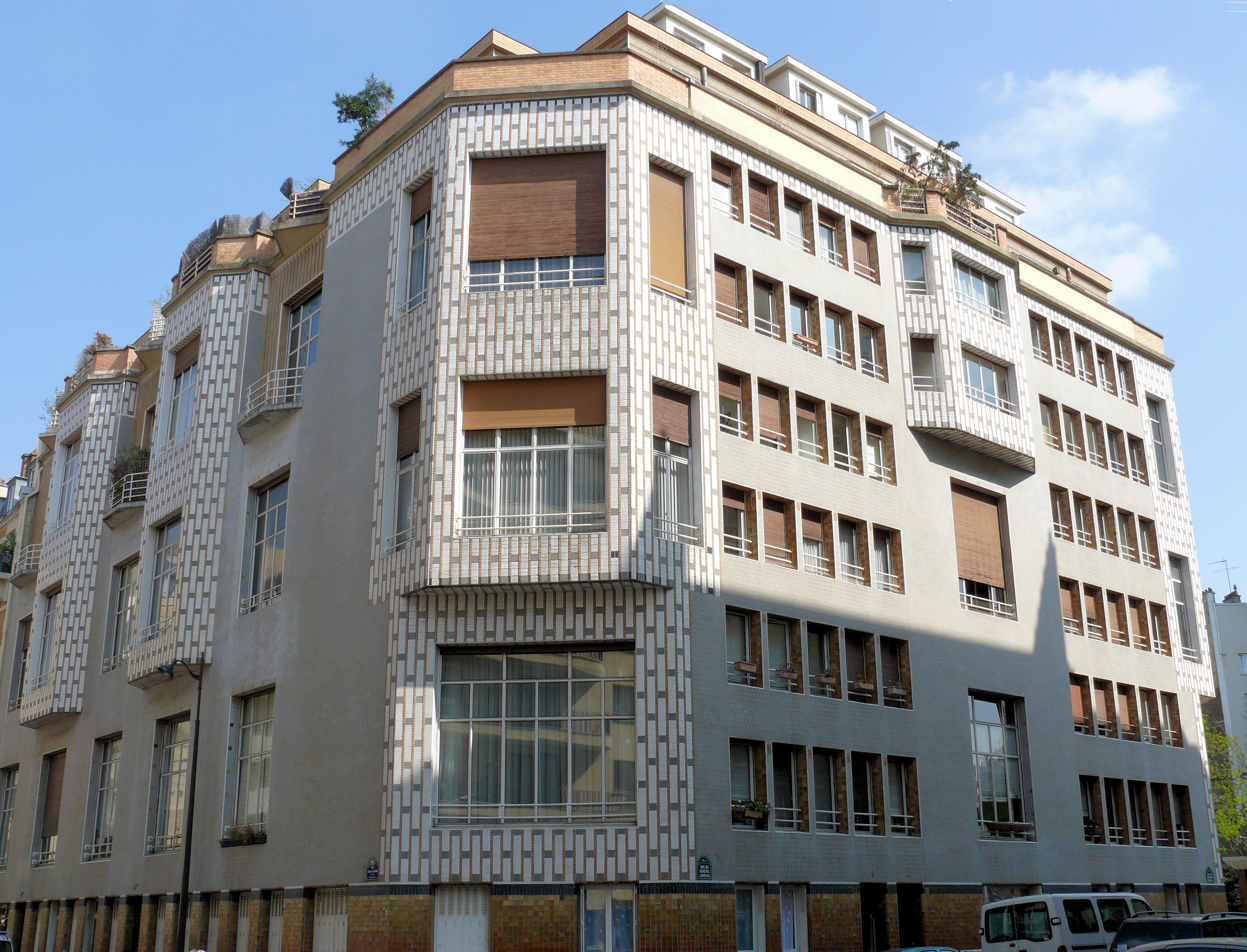
The Studio Building, Paris, an art deco apartment building by Henri Sauvage (1926)

The Villa La Roche, at 10 square du Docteur Blanche in the 16th arrondissement, by Le Corbusier (1923)

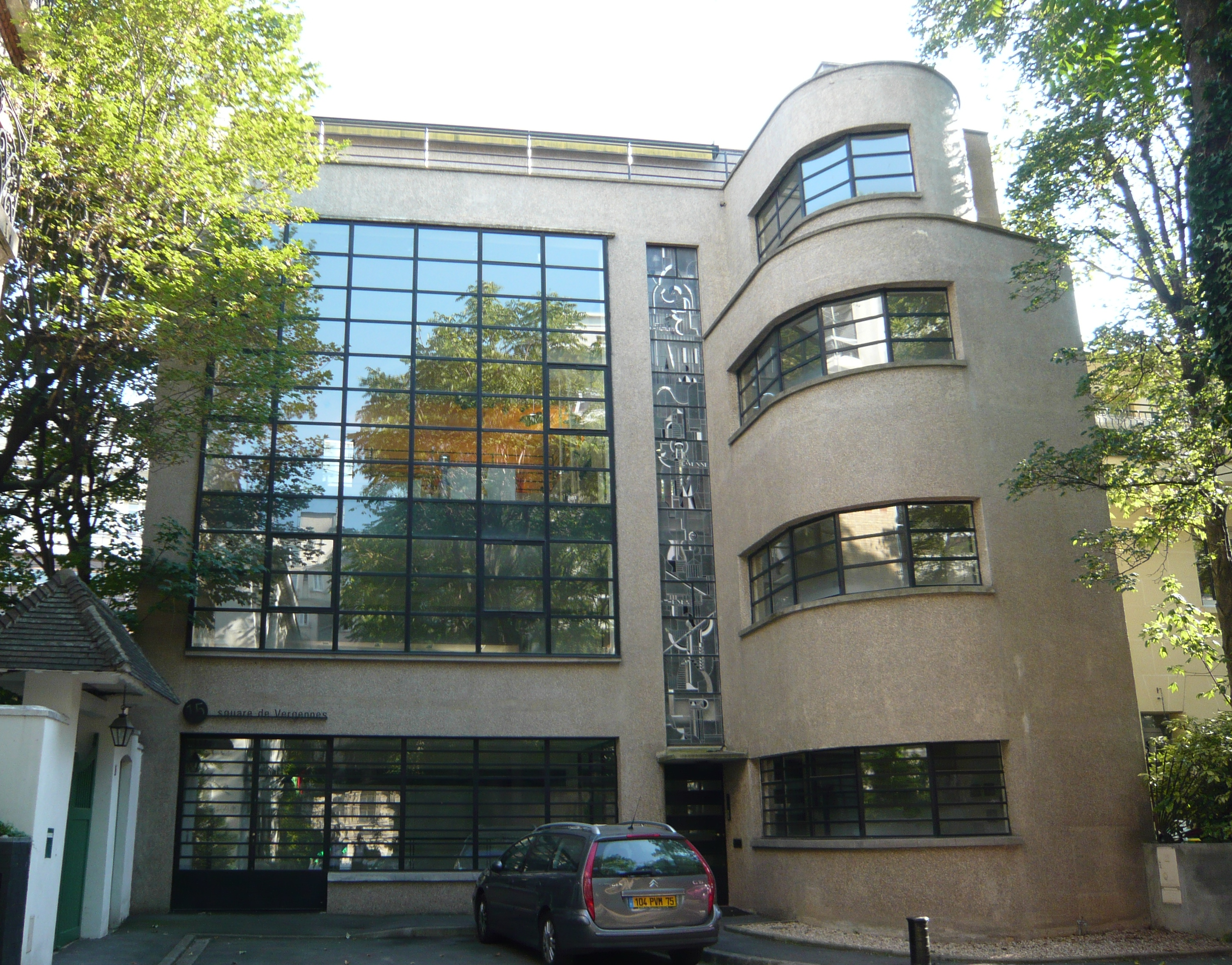
Residence and studio of Louis Barillet, Robert Mallet-Stevens (1931–32)

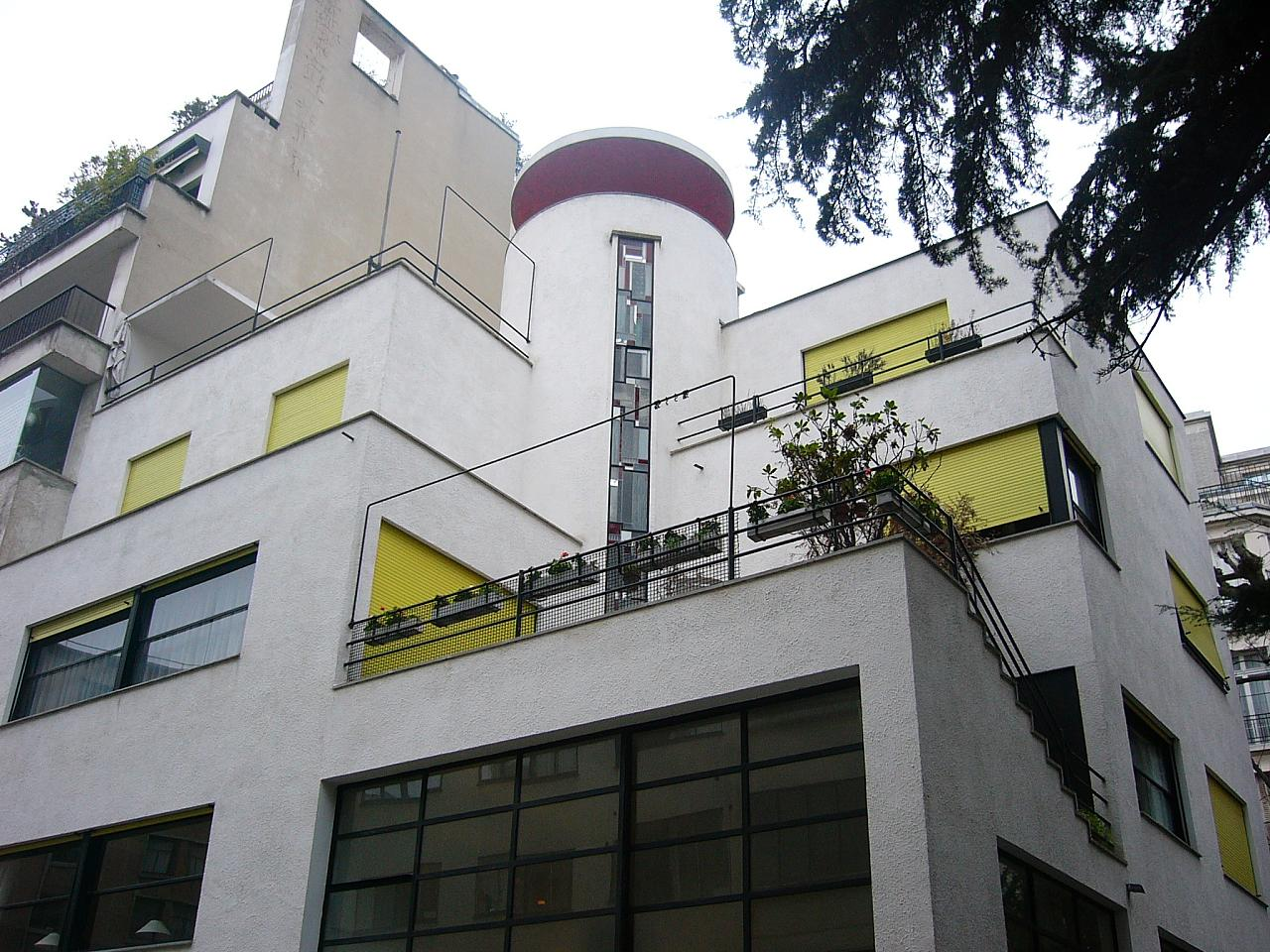
Villa by Robert Mallet-Stevens (1927) on rue Mallet-Stevens (16th arrondissement)

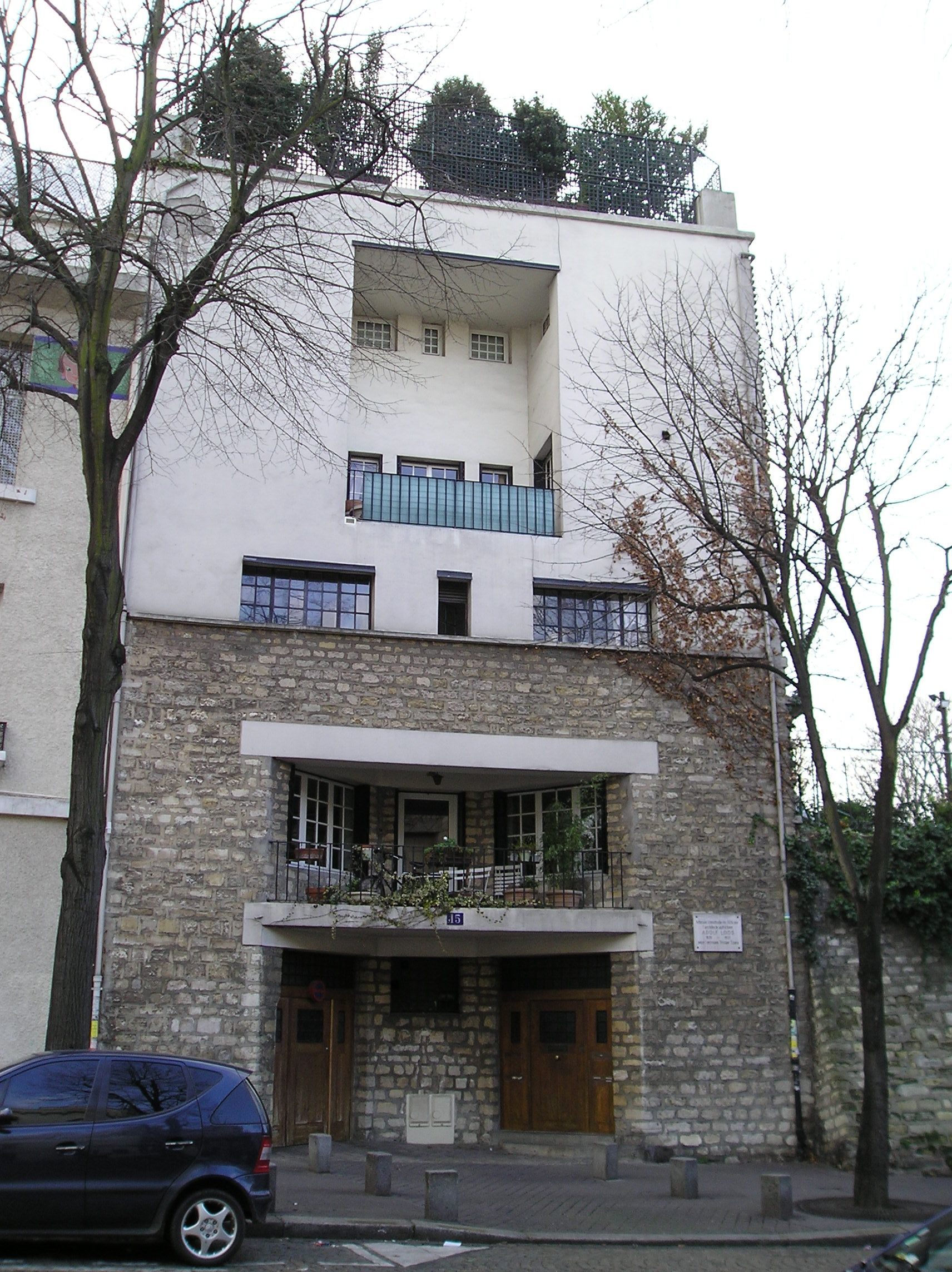
The house of artist Tristan Tzara by Adolf Loos (1927)

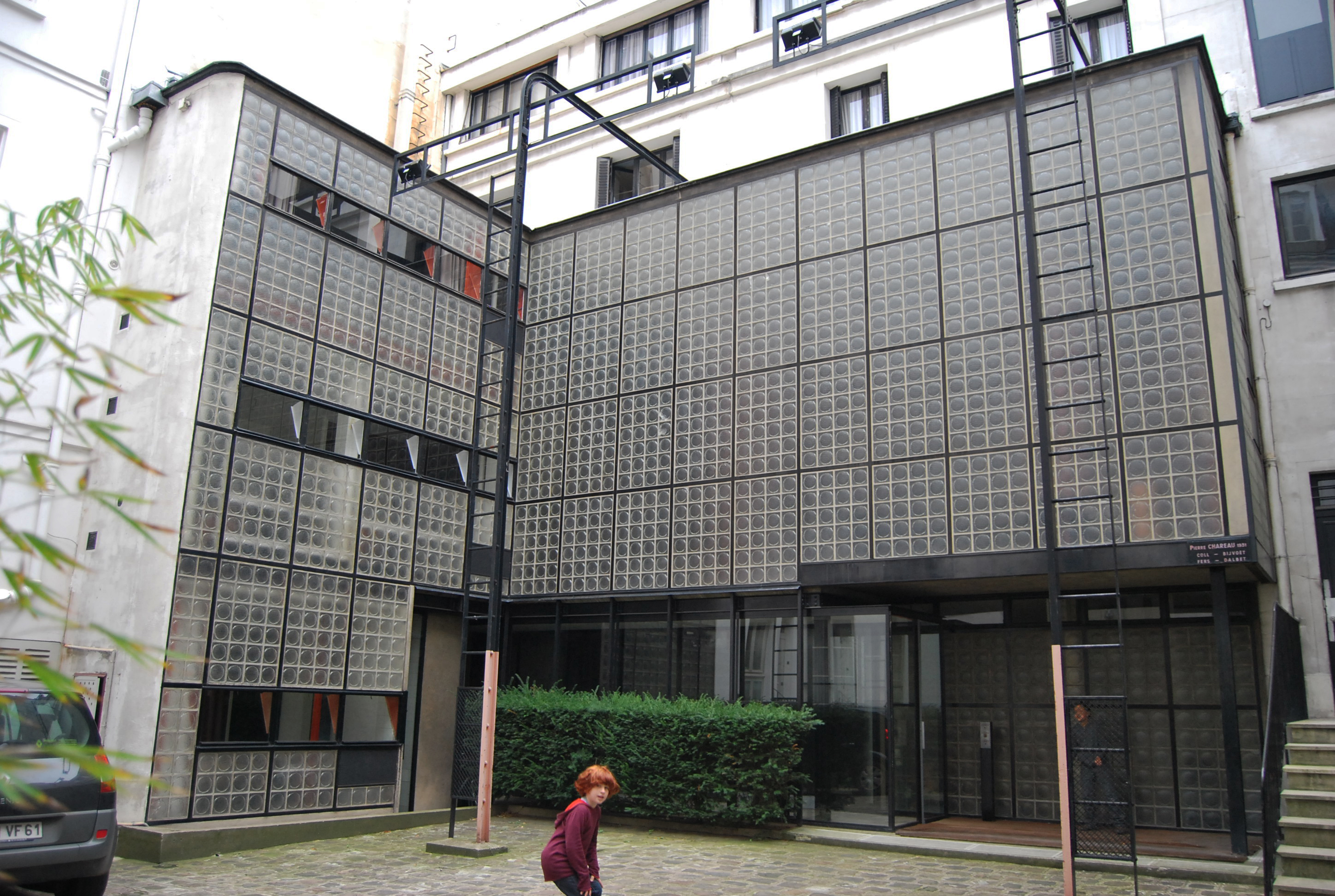
The Maison de Verre or "Glass house" built for Doctor Dalace by Pierre Chareau (1927–1931)

The architect Auguste Perret had anticipated modern residential style in 1904, with an Art Deco house of reinforced concrete faced with ceramics on Rue Franklin. Henri Sauvage also made Art Deco residential buildings with clean geometric lines, made of reinforced concrete faced with white ceramic tiles. The architect Charles-Édouard Jeanneret-Gris, better known as Le Corbusier went further, designing houses in geometric forms, lacking any ornament. At age of twenty-one worked as an assistant in the office of Perret. In 1922, he opened his own architectural office with his cousin Pierre Jeanneret and built some of his first houses in Paris, notably the Villa La Roche at 10 square du Docteur-Blanche in the 16th arrondissement, built for a Swiss banker and art collector. Built in 1923, it introduced elements found in many of Corbusier's later buildings, including white concrete walls, was constructed in 1923, and introduced many of the themes found in Corbusier's later work, including an interior ramp between levels and horizontal bands of windows. He also designed the furniture for the house. Robert Mallet-Stevens pursued a similar modernist style, composed of geometric shapes, walls of glass, and an absence of ornament. He built a studio and residence with a large glass wall and spiral stairway for glass designer Louis Barillet at 15 square Vergennes (15th arrondissement) and constructed a series of houses for artists, each one different, on what is now known as rue Mallet-Stevens in the 16th arrondissement. One of the most striking houses of the 1920s was the house of artist Tristan Tzara at 15 avenue Junot in the 18th arrondissement, designed by the Austrian architect Adolf Loos. The interior was completely irregular: each room was of a different size, and on a different level. Another unusual house was the Maison de Verre or "Glass house" at 31 rue Saint-Guillaume in the 7th arrondissement, built for Doctor Dalace by Pierre Chareau, with Bernard Bijvoet (1927–31). It was made entirely of bricks of glass, supported by a metal frame.

Modernist buildings built in the 1920s and 1930s were relatively rare. The most characteristic Paris residential architect of the 1920s was Michel Roux-Spitz, who built a series of large luxury apartment buildings in the 1920s and 1930s, mostly in the 6th and 7th arrondissements. The buildings were all built of reinforced concrete, had white walls, often faced with stone, and horizontal rows of three-faced bow windows, a modernized version of the Haussmann apartment buildings on the same streets.

=== Public housing ===
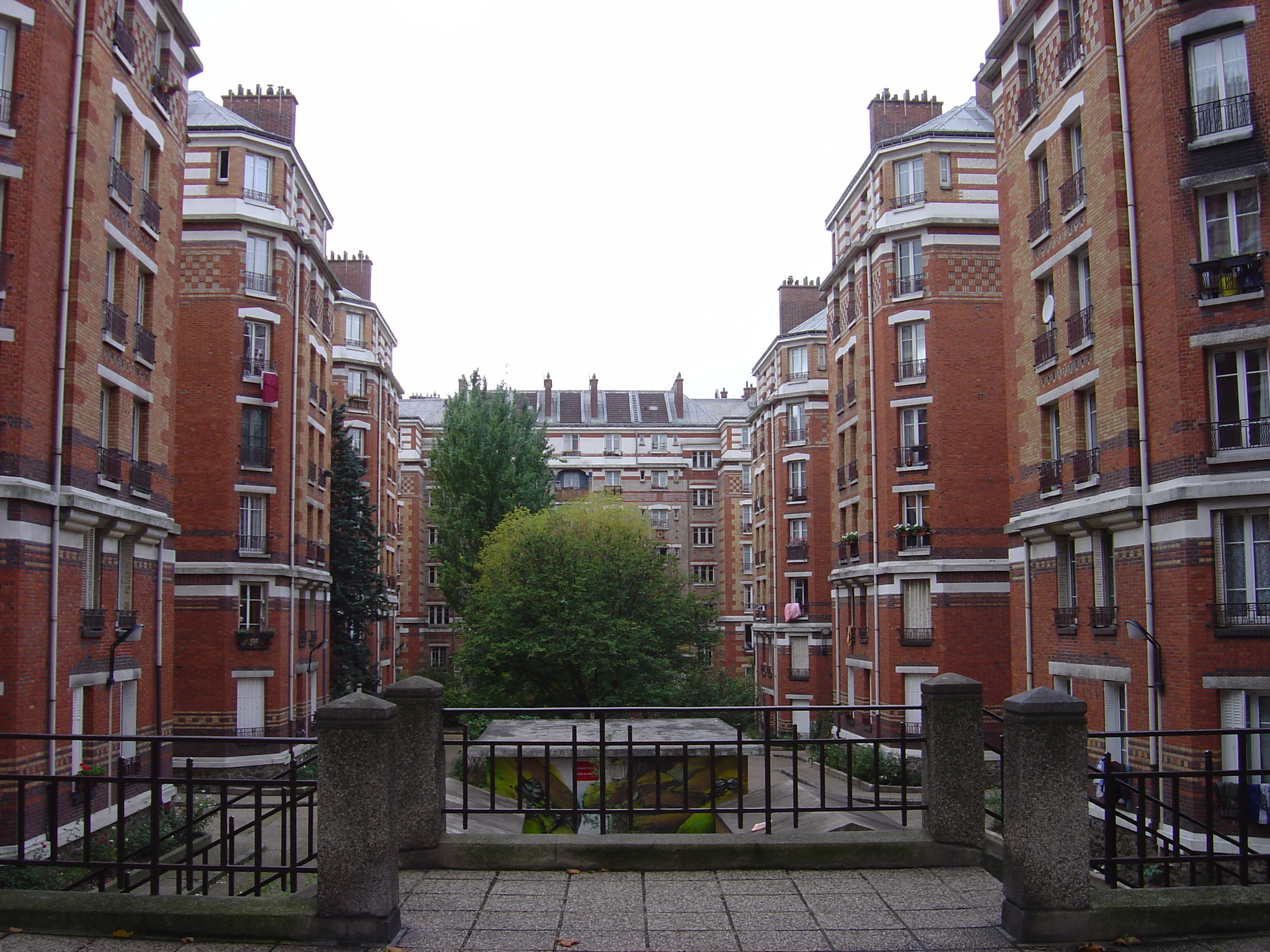
A block of HBMs, or Habitiations à bon marché, at 99 Avenue Simon-Bolivar

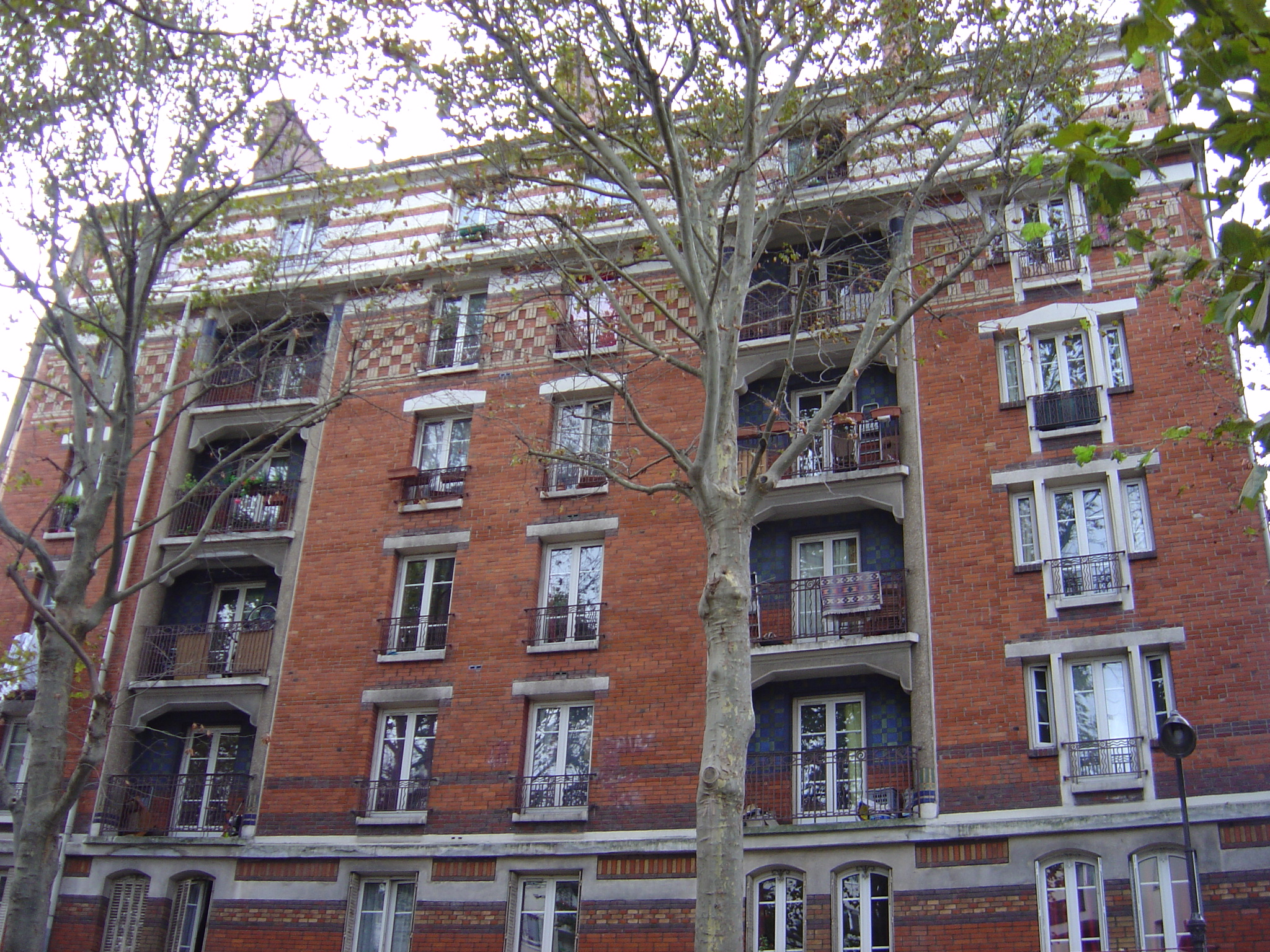
Facade of HBM on Avenue Simon-Bolivar

Beginning in 1919, soon after the end of World War I, the French government began building public housing on a huge scale, particularly on the vacant land of the former fortifications around the city. The new buildings were called HBMs, or Habitations à bon marché (Low-cost residences). They were concentrated to the north, east and south of the city, while a more expensive type of housing, the ILM, or Immeubles à loyer moyen, or moderate priced residences, intended for the middle class, were built to the west of the city. A special agency of architects was established to design the buildings. The first group of 2,734 new housing units, called the Cité de Montmartre was built between the Portes of Clignancourt and Montmartre between 1922 and 1928. The new buildings were constructed of concrete and brick. The earliest buildings had many decorative elements, particularly at the roofline, including concrete pergolas. The decoration became less over the years, and over time the brick gave way gradually to reinforced concrete façades.

=== Religious architecture ===
Church of Saint-Esprit, 186 avenue Daumesnil (12th arr.) by Paul Tournon (1928–32), has modern exterior and massive reinforced concrete Byzantine dome.

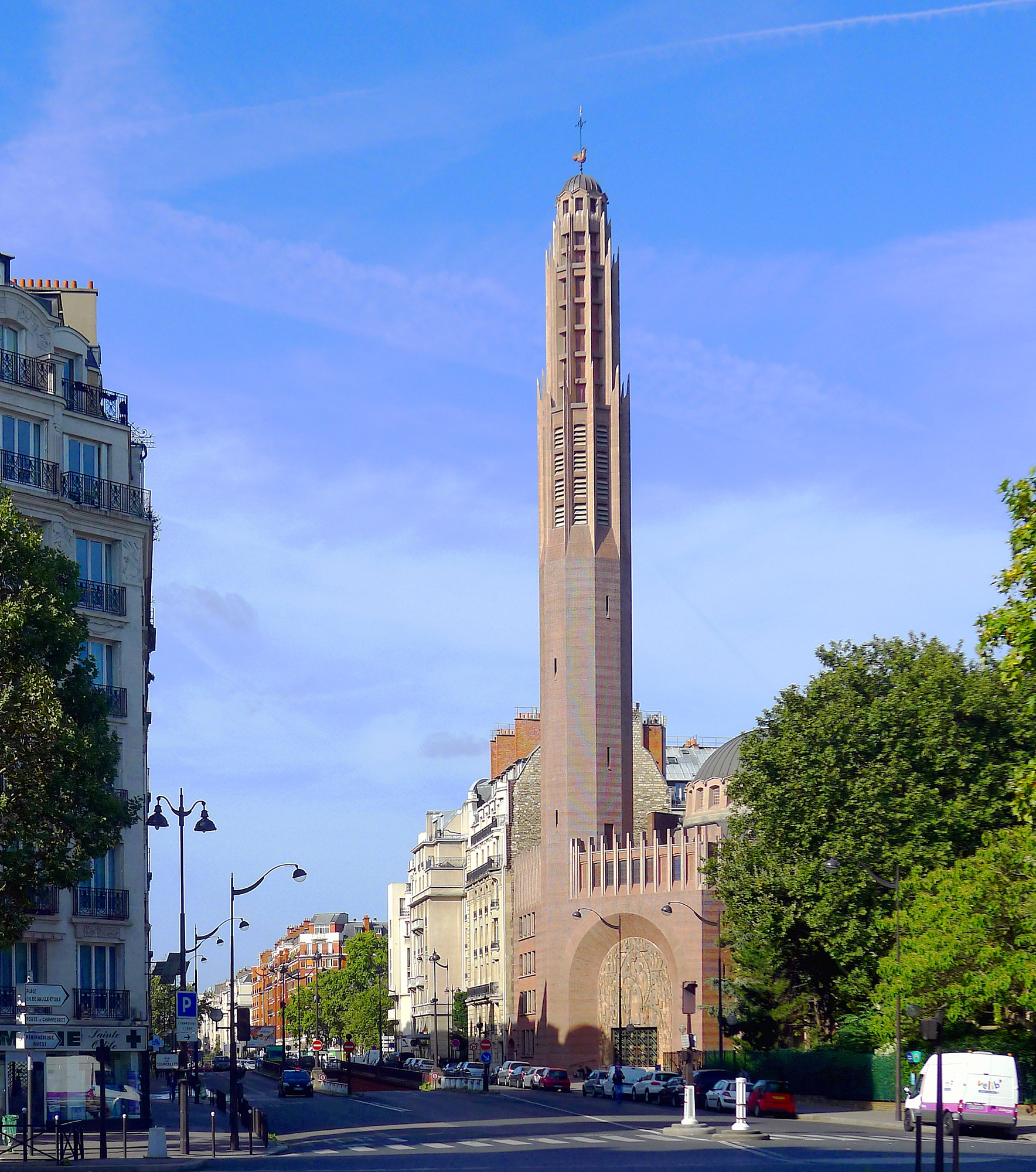
The church of Sainte-Odile at 2 avenue Stephane-Mallarmé (17th) (1935–1939) has the highest bell tower in Paris

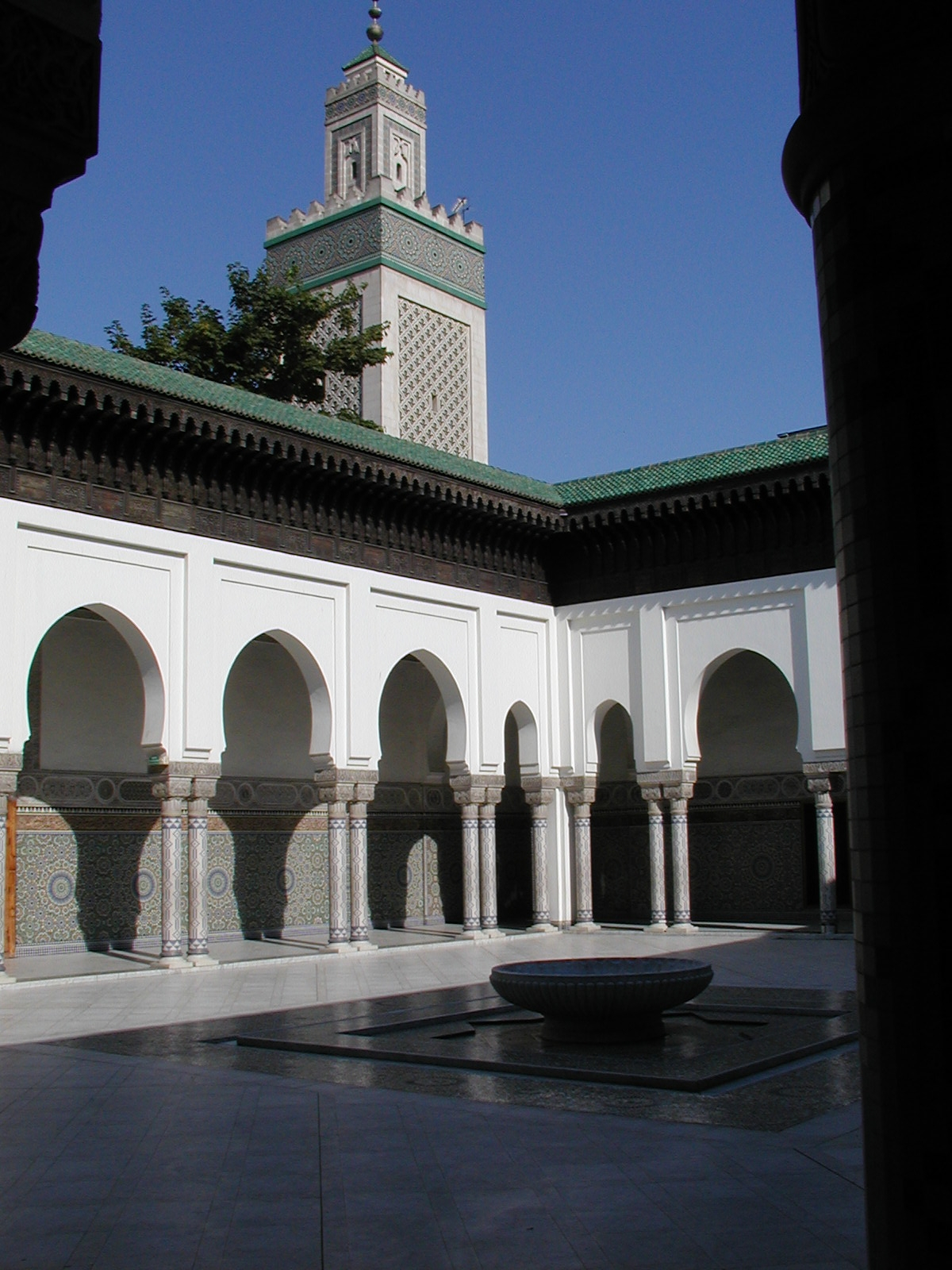
The Grand Mosque of Paris (1920–1924) built to honor the Muslim soldiers who died fighting for France in World War I.

Several new churches were built in Paris between the wars, in varied styles. The Église du Saint-Esprit (1928–32), located at 186 Avenue Daumesnil in the 12th arrondissement, was designed by Paul Tournon. It has a modern exterior made of reinforced concrete covered with red brick and a modern bell tower 75 meters high, but the central feature is a huge dome, 22 meters in diameter. The design, like that of the Sacré-Cœur Basilica, was inspired by Byzantine churches. The interior was decorated with murals by several notable artists, including Maurice Denis. The Église Saint-Pierre-de-Chaillot, at 31 avenue Marceau (16th), was designed by Émile Bois (1932–38). Its tower and massive Romanesque entrance was inspired by the churches of the Périgord region. The Church of Sainte-Odile at 2 Avenue Stephane-Mallarmé (17th arrondissement), by Jacques Barges (1935–39) has a single nave, three neo-Byzantine cupolas, and the highest bell tower in Paris.

The Grand Mosque of Paris was one of the more unusual buildings constructed during the period. Intended to honor the Muslim soldiers from the French colonies who died for France during the war, it was designed by the architect Maurice Tranchant de Lunel, and built and decorated with the assistance of craftsmen from North Africa. The project was funded by the National Assembly in 1920, construction began in 1922, and it was completed in 1924, and dedicated by the President of France, Gaston Doumergue, and the Sultan of Morocco, Moulay Youssef. The style was termed "Hispano-Moorish" and the design was largely influenced by the Grand Mosque of Fez, Morocco.

== After World War II (1946–2000) ==
=== The triumph of modernism ===
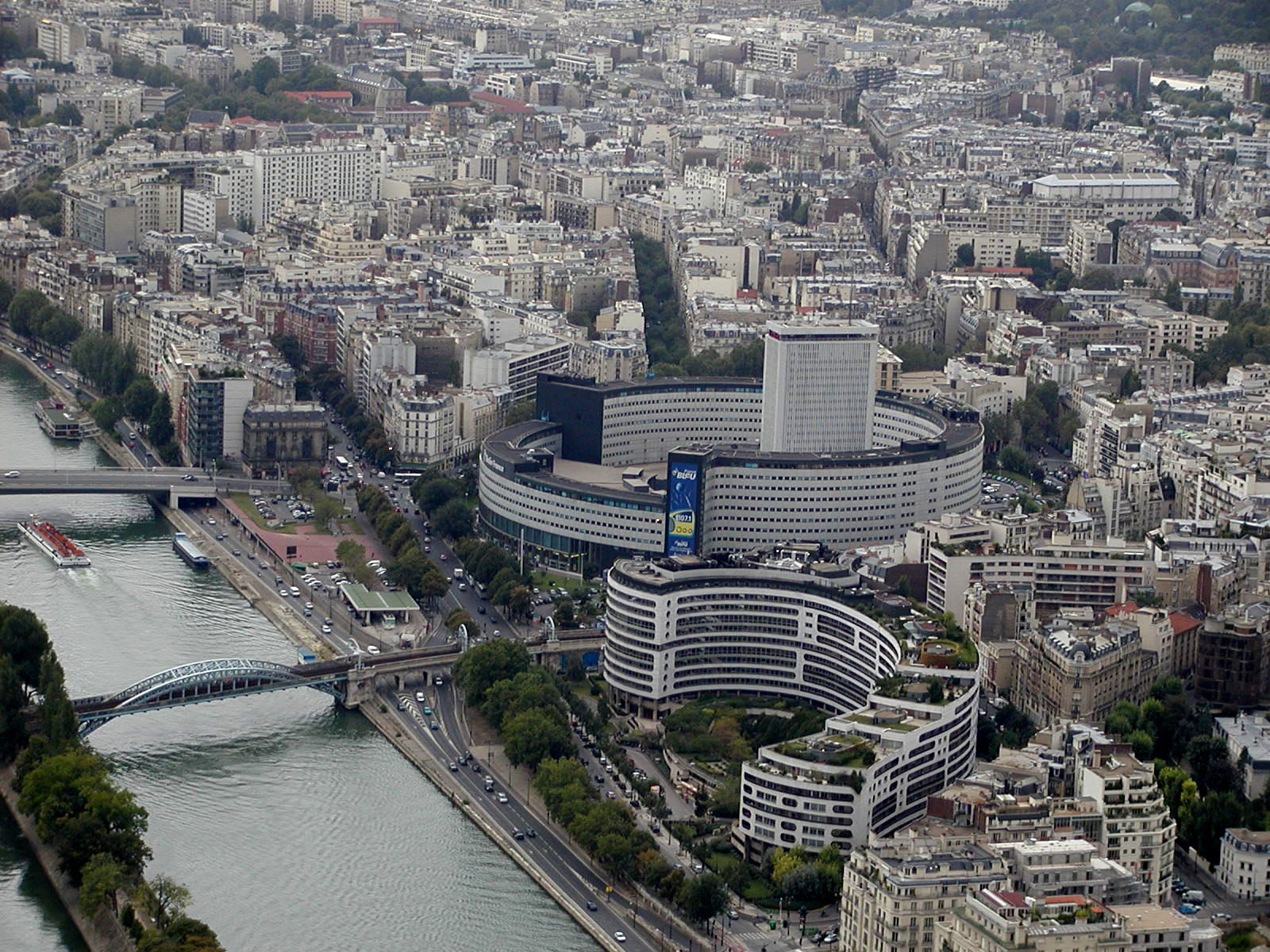
The Maison de la Radio (16th arrondissement) by Henry Bernard (1953–1963)

Headquarters of the French Communist Party at place du Colonel Fabien, by Oscar Niemeyer (1968–1971)

Interior of the auditorium of the headquarters of the French Communist Party, by Oscar Niemeyer

In the years after World War II, modernism became the official style for public buildings, both because it was new and fashionable, and partly because it was usually less expensive to build. Buildings were designed to express their function, using simple geometric forms, with a minimum of ornament and decoration. They were usually designed so that every office had its own window and view. The materials of choice were reinforced concrete, sometimes covered with aluminium panels, and glass. The term "Palais" used for many public buildings before the war was replaced by the more modest term "Maison", or "House." In place of decoration, the buildings often contained works of sculpture in interior courtyards and were surrounded by gardens. There was little if anything specifically French about the new buildings; they resembled modernist buildings in the United States and other parts of Europe, and, particularly under President François Mitterrand, were often designed by internationally famous architects from other countries.

Among the earliest and most influential of the new public buildings was the Maison de la Radio (1952–1963), the headquarters of French national radio and television, along the Seine in the 16th arrondissement, designed by Henry Bernard. Bernard had studied at the École des Beaux-Arts, won the Prix de Rome, and eventually became the head of the Academy of Beaux-Arts, but he converted with enthusiasm to the new style. The Maison de la Radio was composed of two circular buildings fitted one inside the other, an outer circle facing the river, with a thousand offices, an inner circle made up of studios, and a 68-meter tall tower in the center, which contains the archives. It was originally designed with a concrete façade on the outer building, but it was modified and covered with a skin of aluminium and glass. It was described by its builders as a continuation toward the west of the line of great monuments beside the Seine: the Louvre, the Grand Palais, and Palais de Chaillot.

Other major public buildings in the monumental modernist style included the headquarters of UNESCO, the United Nations cultural headquarters, on Place Fontenoy in the 7th arrondissement, by Marcel Breuer, Bernard Zehrfuss and Pier Luigi Nervi (1954–1958), in the form of a tripod of three wings made of reinforced concrete, with gardens between the wings. Each office in the building benefited from natural light and an exterior view. The headquarters of the French Communist Party at 2 Place du Colonel Fabien (19th arrondissement), was designed by Oscar Niemeyer, who had just finished designing Brasília, the new Brazilian capital city. It was constructed between 1969 and 1980 and was an eight-story block built on columns above the street, with a smooth undulating glass façade. The auditorium next to the building was half buried underground, covered by a concrete dome that allowed light to enter.

=== Presidential projects ===
The Centre Georges Pompidou by Renzo Piano and Richard Rogers (1977)

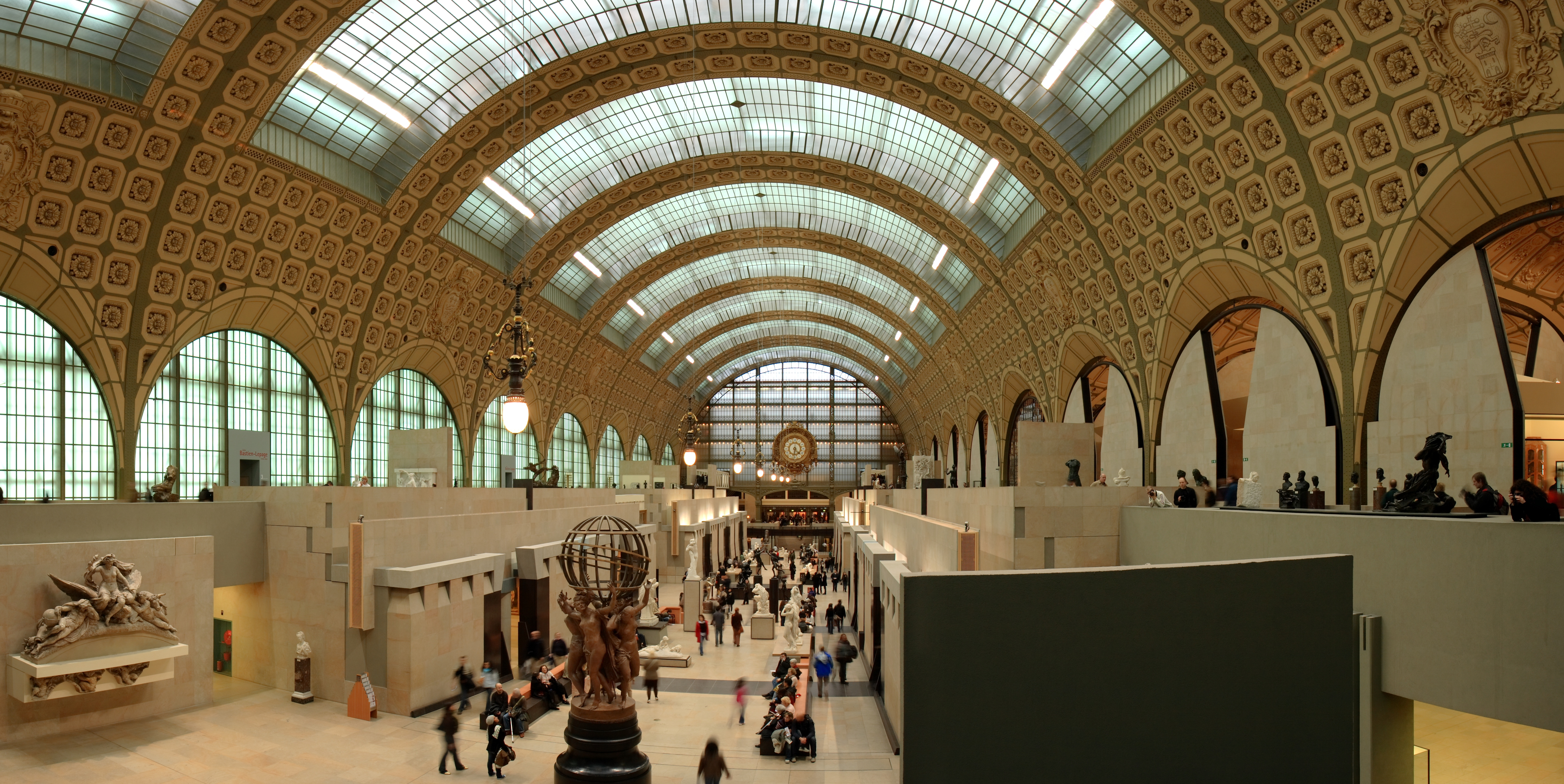
The Musée d'Orsay, a conversion of a 19th-century train station (1978–1986) by Gae Aulenti

Pyramid of the Grand Louvre (1983–1989), by I. M. Pei

La Géode at the City of Sciences and Industry, by Adrien Fainsilber (1980-1986)

The Opéra Bastille (1983–1989) by Carlos Ott

The Grande Arche of La Défense (1983–1989) by Johan Otto von Spreckelsen

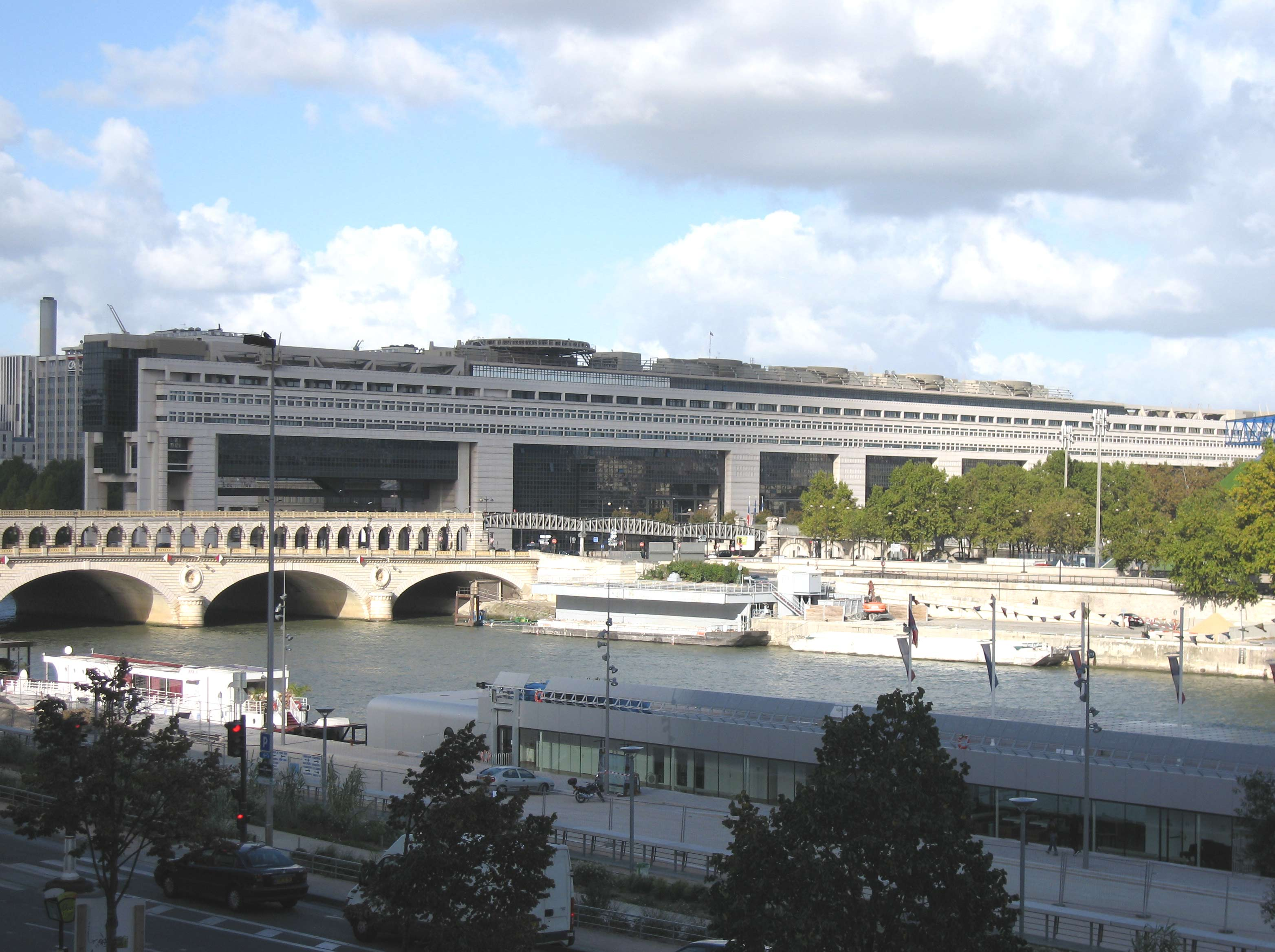
The Ministries of Finance and the Economy, at Bercy (1982–1988) by Paul Chemetov and Borja Huidobro

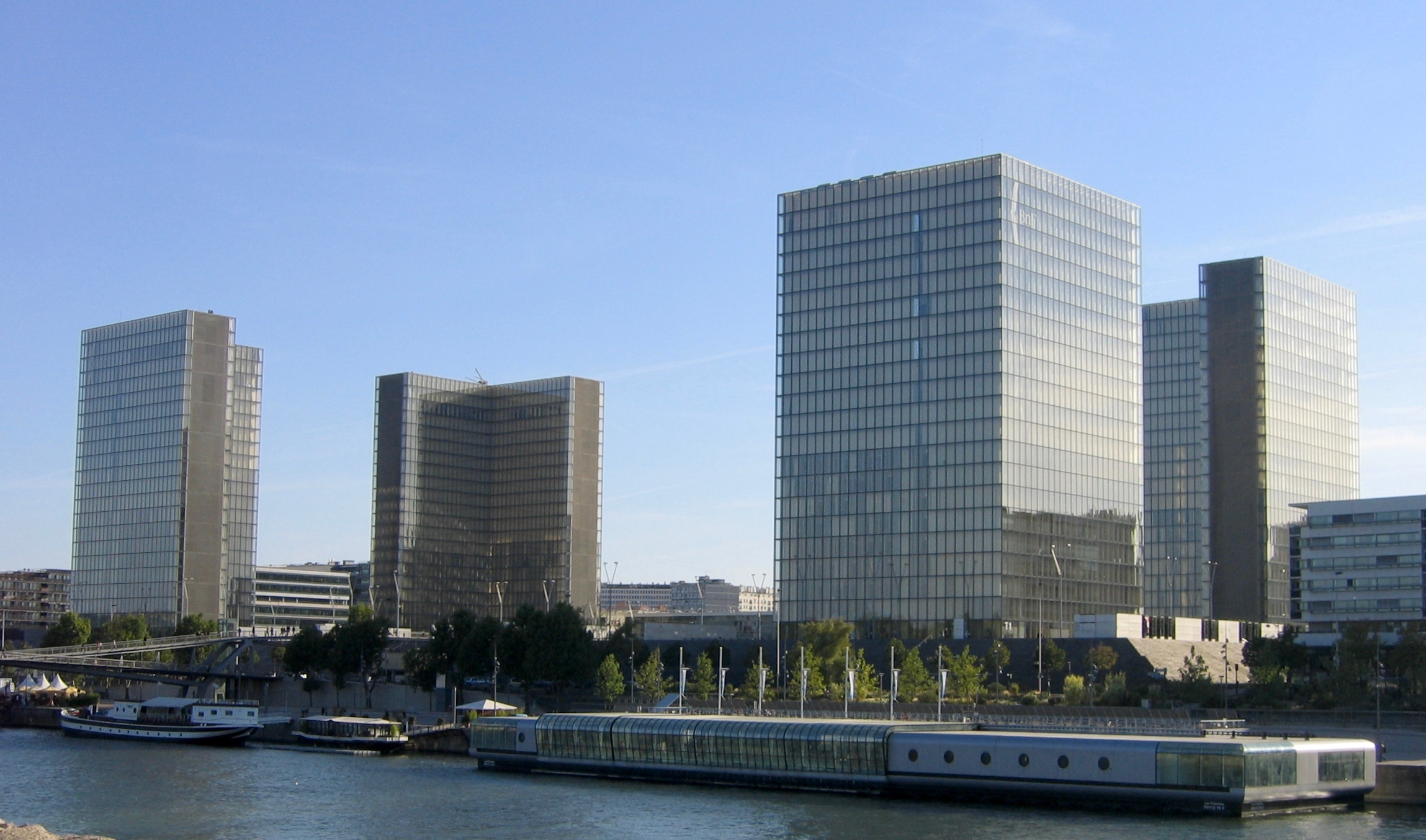
The François Mitterrand site of the French National Library (1989–1995) by Dominique Perrault

In the 1970s, French Presidents began to build major architectural projects which became their legacy, usually finished after they left office. The first was Georges Pompidou, a noted admirer and patron of modern art, who made plans for what became, after his death in 1974, the Centre Pompidou. It was designed by Renzo Piano and Richard Rogers, and expressed all of its mechanical functions on the exterior of the building, with brightly colored pipes, ducts and escalators. The principal architectural projects begun by his successor, Giscard d'Estaing, were the conversion of the Musée d'Orsay, a central railroad station transformed into a museum devoted to 19th-century French art (1978–86), and the City of Sciences and Industry (1980–86) in the Parc de la Villette in the 19th arrondissement, whose features included the La Géode, a geodesic sphere 36 meters in diameter made of polished stainless steel, now containing an omnimax theater (1980–86), designed by Adrien Feinsilber.

Between 1981 and 1995, François Mitterrand had fourteen years in power, enough time to complete more projects than any president since Napoleon III. In the case of the Louvre Pyramid, he personally selected the architect, without a competition. He completed the projects begun by Giscard d'Estaing and began even more ambitious projects of his own, many of them designed for the celebration of the bicentennial of the French Revolution in 1989. His Grands travaux ("Great Works") included the Institut du Monde Arabe by architect Jean Nouvel, finished in 1987; the Grand Louvre, including the glass pyramid (1983–89) designed by I. M. Pei; the Grande Arche of La Défense by the Danish architect Johan Otto von Spreckelsen, a building in the form of a giant ceremonial arch, which marked the western end of the historical axis that began at the Louvre (inaugurated July 1989); the Opéra Bastille, by architect Carlos Ott, opened on 13 July 1989, the day before the bicentennial of the French Revolution, and a new building for the Ministries of the Economy and Finance, at Bercy (12th arrondissement) (1982–88), a massive building next to the Seine which resembled both a gateway to the city and a huge bridge with its feet in the river, designed by Paul Chemetov and Borja Huidobro. His last project was located on the other side of the Seine from the Finance Ministry; a group of four book-shaped glass towers for the Bibliothèque nationale de France (1989–95), designed by Dominique Perrault. The books were stored in the towers, while the reading rooms were located beneath a terrace between the buildings, with windows looking out onto a garden.

=== The age of towers ===
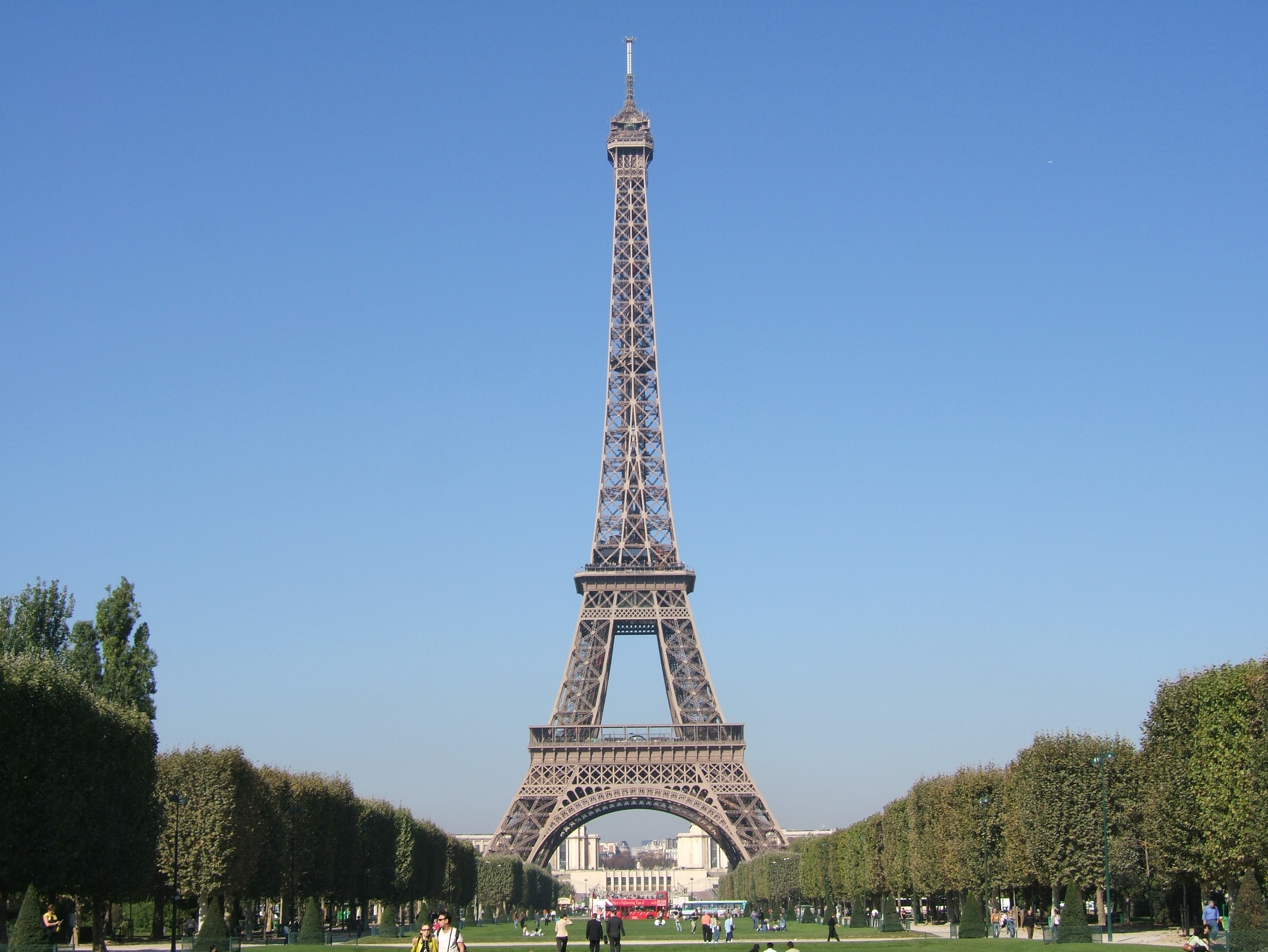
The Eiffel Tower 330 meters (1889)

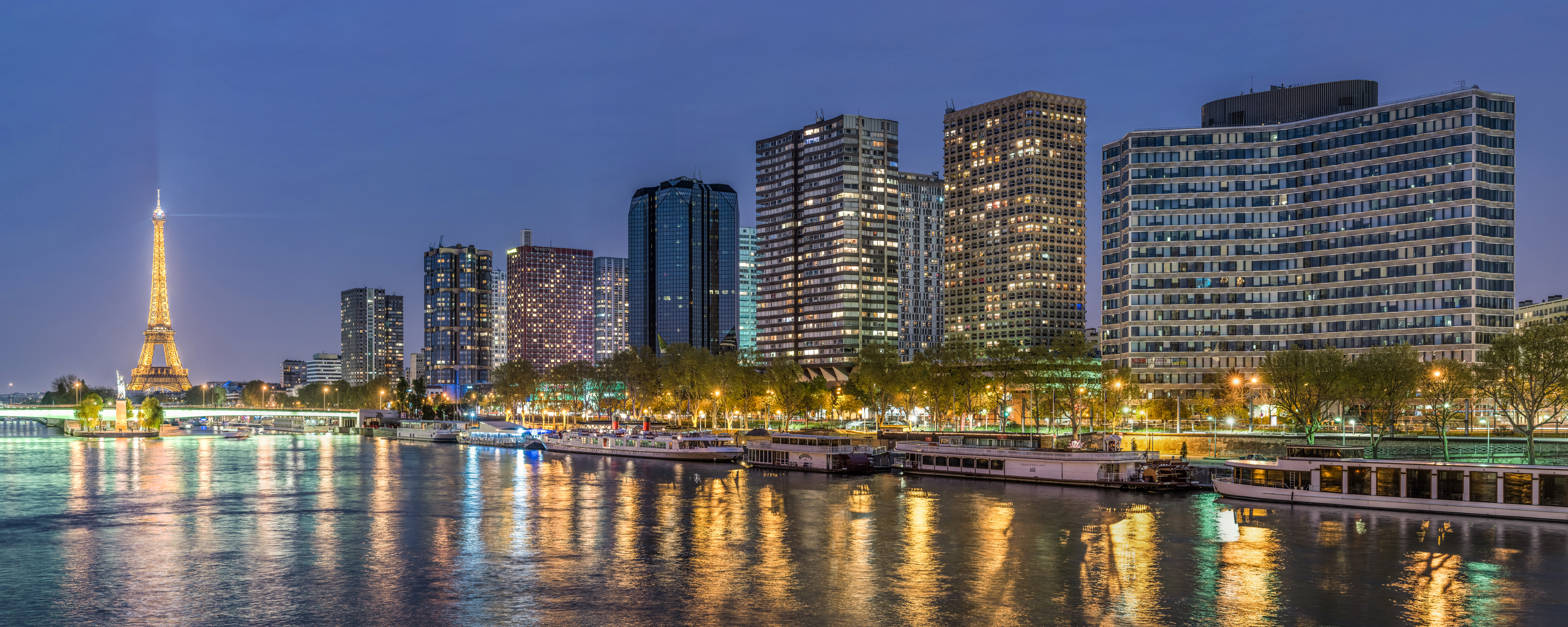
The Front de Seine project in the 15th arrondissement (1970s)

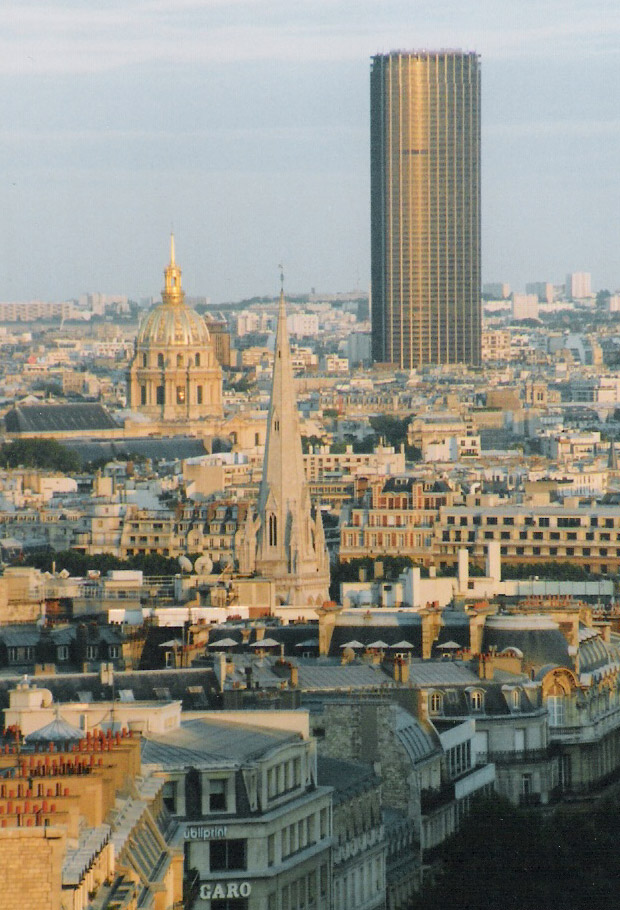
Tour Montparnasse, 210 meters (1973)

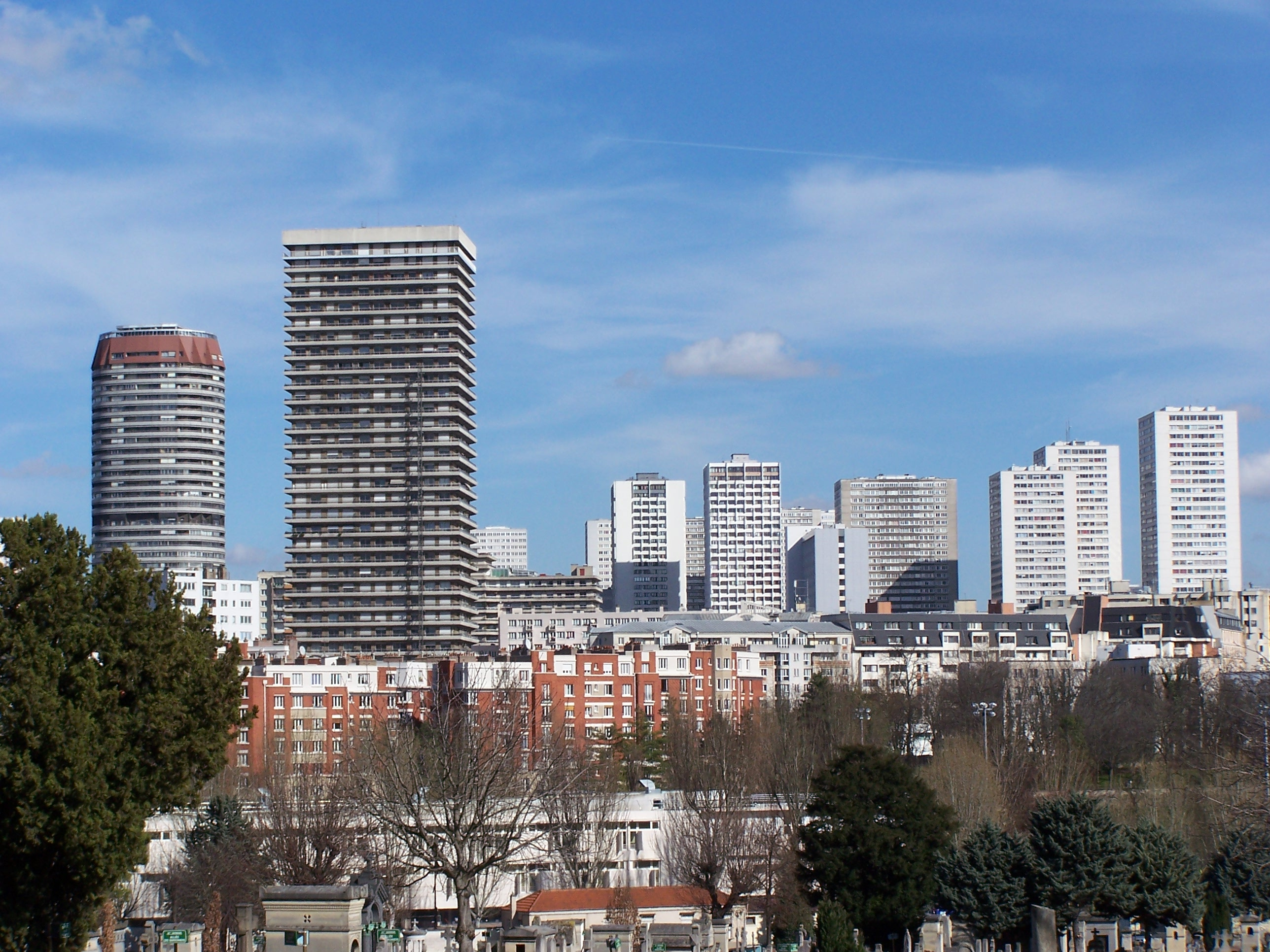
Towers in the 13th arrondissement (1970s)

Tour First in La Défense, 225 meters (1974)

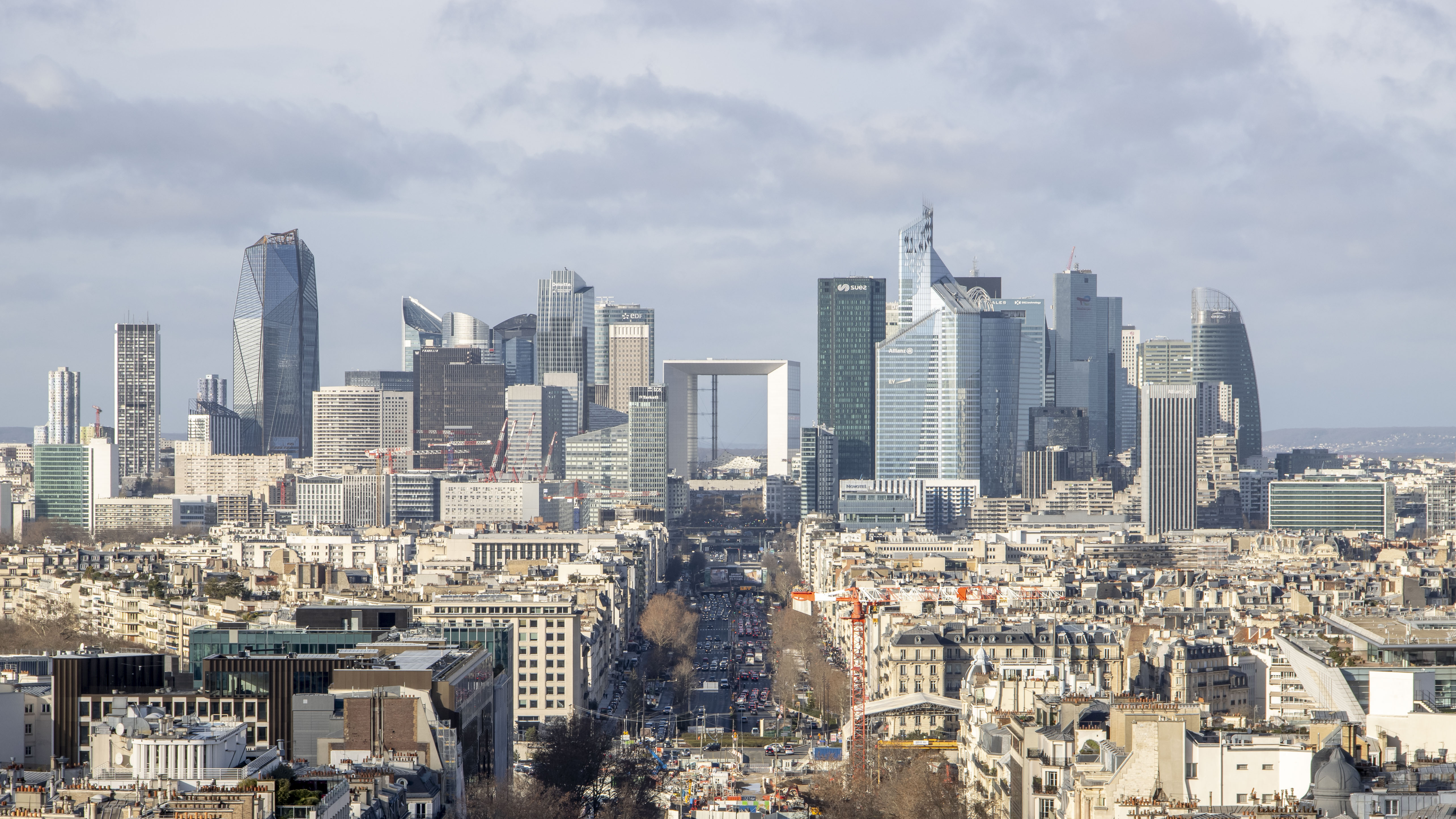
The business district of La Défense, to the west of Paris

Until the 1960s there were no tall buildings in Paris to share the skyline with the Eiffel Tower, the tallest structure in the city; a strict height limit of thirty-five meters was in place. However, in October 1958, under the Fifth Republic, in order to permit the construction of more housing and office buildings, the rules began to change. A new urban plan for the city was adopted by the municipal council in 1959. Higher buildings were permitted, as long as they met both technical and aesthetic standards. The first new tower to be constructed was an apartment building, the Tour Croulebarbe, at 33 rue Croulebarbe in the 13th arrondissement. It was twenty-two stories, and 61 meters high, and was completed in 1961. Between 1960 and 1975, about 160 new buildings higher than fifteen stories were constructed in Paris, more than half of them in the 13th and 15th arrondissements. Most of them were about one hundred meters high; several clusters of high-rises the work one developer, Michel Holley, who built the towers of Place d'Italie, Front de Seine, and Hauts de Belleville.

Two of the projects of residential towers were especially large: 29 hectares along the banks of the Seine at Beaugrenelle, and 87 hectares between Place de l'Italie and Tolbiac. Blocks of old buildings were torn town and replaced with residential towers.

Between 1959 and 1968, the old Montparnasse railway station was demolished and rebuilt nearby, making a large parcel of land available for construction. The municipal council learned of the project only indirectly, through a message from the ministry in charge of construction projects. The first plan, proposed in 1957, was a new headquarters for Air France, a state-owned enterprise, in a tower 150 meters high. In 1959, the proposed height was increased to 170 meters. In 1965, to protect the views in the historic part of the city, the municipal council declared that the new building should be shorter, so it would not visible from the esplanade of Les Invalides. In 1967, the Prefect of Paris, representing the government of President de Gaulle, overruled the municipal council decision, raised the height to two hundred meters, to create more rentable office space. The new building, built between 1969 and 1972, was (and still is) the tallest building within the city limits.

The growing number of skyscrapers appearing on the Paris skyline provoked resistance from the Paris population. In 1975, President Giscard d'Estaing declared a moratorium on new towers within the city, and in 1977 the City of Paris was given a new Plan d'Occupation des Sols (POS) or Land use plan, which imposed a height limit of twenty-five meters in the center of Paris and 31 meters in the outer arrondissements. Also, new buildings are required to be constructed right up to the sidewalk, without setbacks, further discouraging very tall buildings. The building of skyscrapers continued outside of Paris, particularly in the new business district of La Défense.

At the end of the 20th century, the tallest structure in the City of Paris and the Île-de-France was still the Eiffel Tower in the 7th arrondissement, 324 meters high, completed in 1889. The tallest building in the Paris region was the Tour First, at 225 meters, located in La Défense built in 1974.

=== Public housing – the HLM and the barre ===
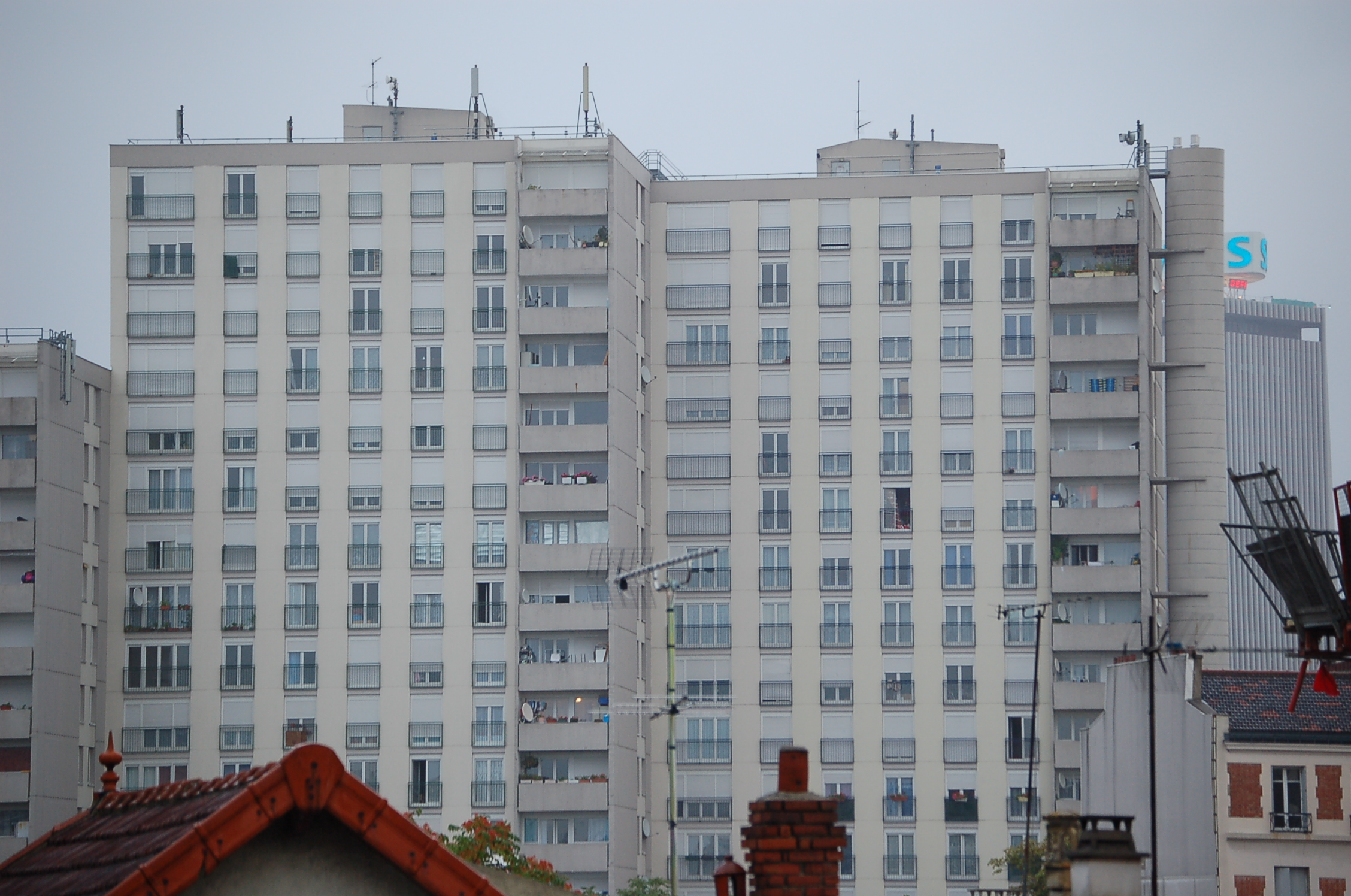
HLM, or public housing project, in the Paris suburb of Saint-Denis

After the War Paris faced a severe housing shortage; most of the housing in the city dated to the 19th century and was in terrible condition. Only two thousand new housing units were constructed between 1946 and 1950. The number rose to 4,230 in 1951 and more than 10,000 in 1956. The office of public housing of the City of Paris acquired the cheapest land it could buy, at the edges of the city. In 1961, when land within the city was exhausted, they were authorized to begin buying land in the surrounding suburbs. The first postwar social housing buildings were relatively low- three or four stories. Much larger buildings began to appear in the mid-1950s. They were built with prefabricated materials and placed in clusters. They were known as HLMs, or Habitations à loyer moderé, or moderate-cost housing. A larger type of HLM began to appear in the mid-1950s, known as a barre, because it was longer than it was high. The usually had between 200 and 300 apartments, were built in clusters, and were often some distance from shops and public transportation. They were welcomed by the families who lived there in the 1950s and early 1960s, but in later years they were crowded with recent immigrants and suffered from crime, drugs and social unrest.

== Contemporary (2001–present ) ==
Paris architecture since 2000 has been very diverse, with no single dominant style. In the field of museums and monuments, the most prominent name has been Jean Nouvel. His earlier work in Paris included the Institut du Monde Arabe (1982–87), and the Fondation Cartier (1992–94), which features a glass screen between the building and the street. In 2006 he completed the Musée du Quai Branly, the Presidential project of Jacques Chirac, a museum presenting the cultures of Asia, Africa and the Americas. It also included a glass screen between the building and the street, as well as a façade covered with living plants. In 2015, he completed the new Philharmonie de Paris at Parc de la Villette.

The American architect Frank Gehry also made a notable contribution to Paris architect, for his American Center in Bercy (1994), which became the home of the Cinémathèque Française in 2005; and for the building of the Louis Vuitton Foundation, a museum of modern and contemporary art in the Bois de Boulogne.

Musée du Quai Branly by Jean Nouvel (2006)

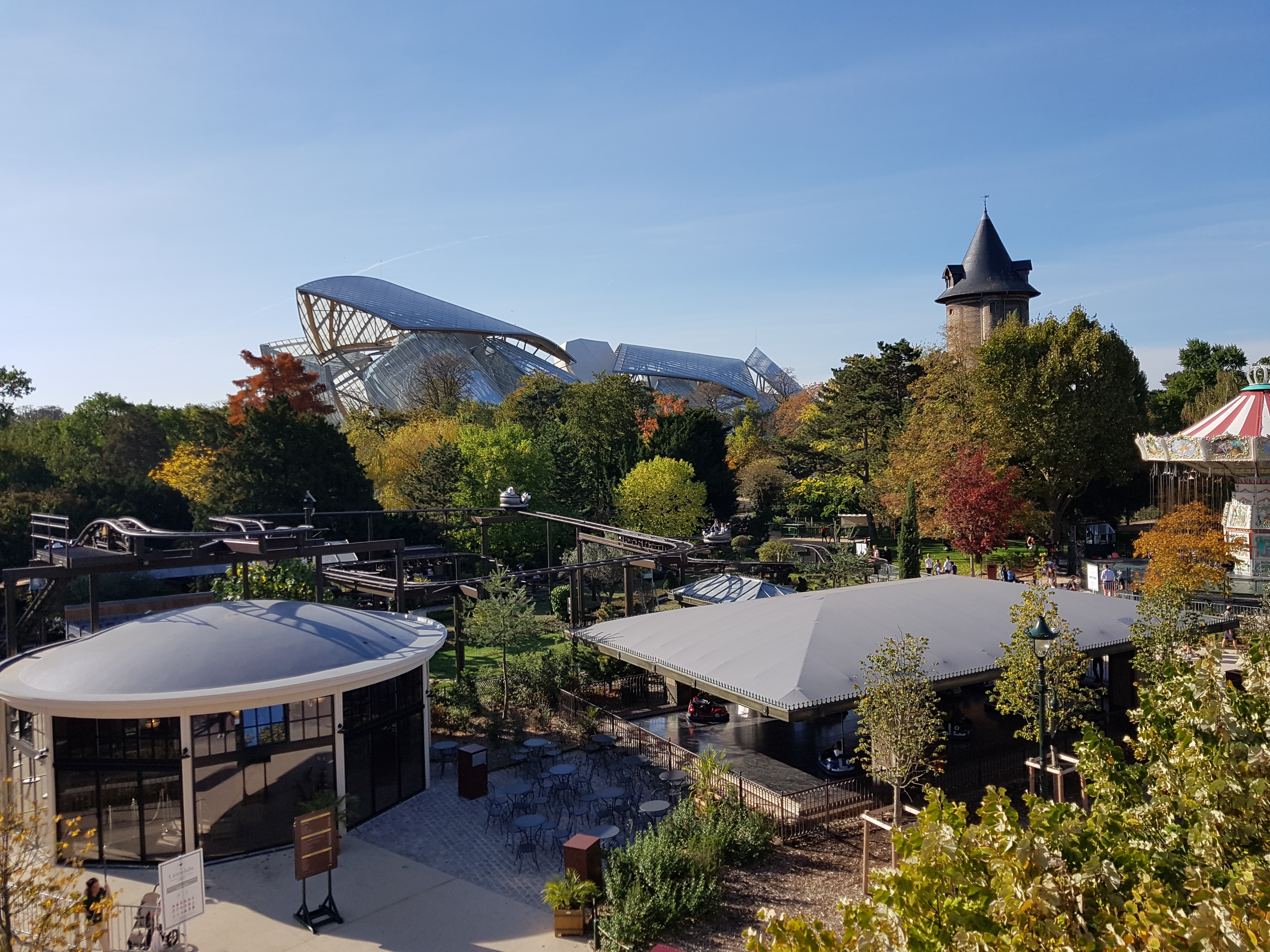
The Louis Vuitton Foundation building by Frank Gehry (2014)

The Hôtel Berlier (1986–89), by Dominique Perrault

The Philharmonie de Paris concert hall by Jean Nouvel (2015)

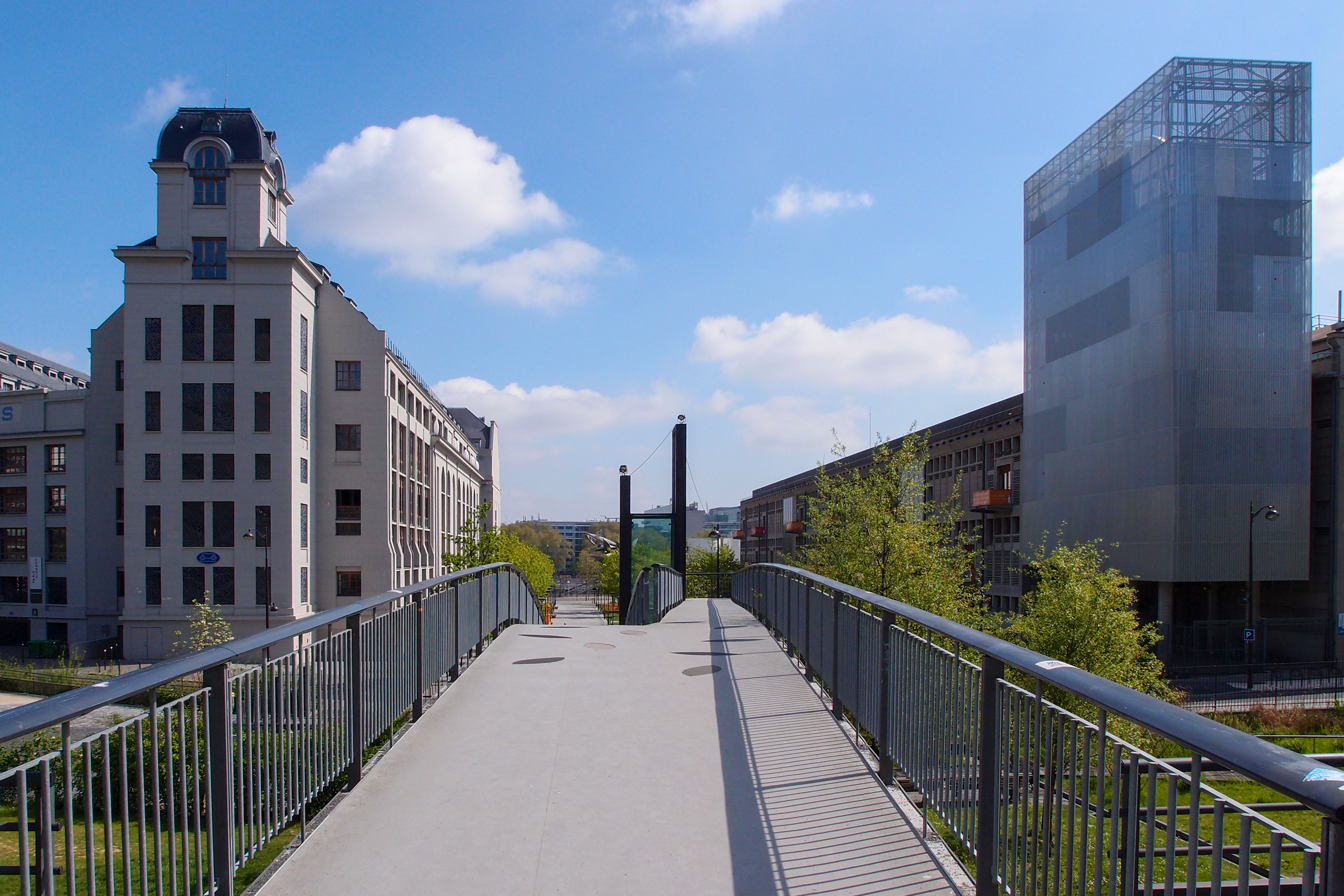
A flour mill and grain storage warehouse were turned into campus buildings for the Paris Diderot University (2002–07)

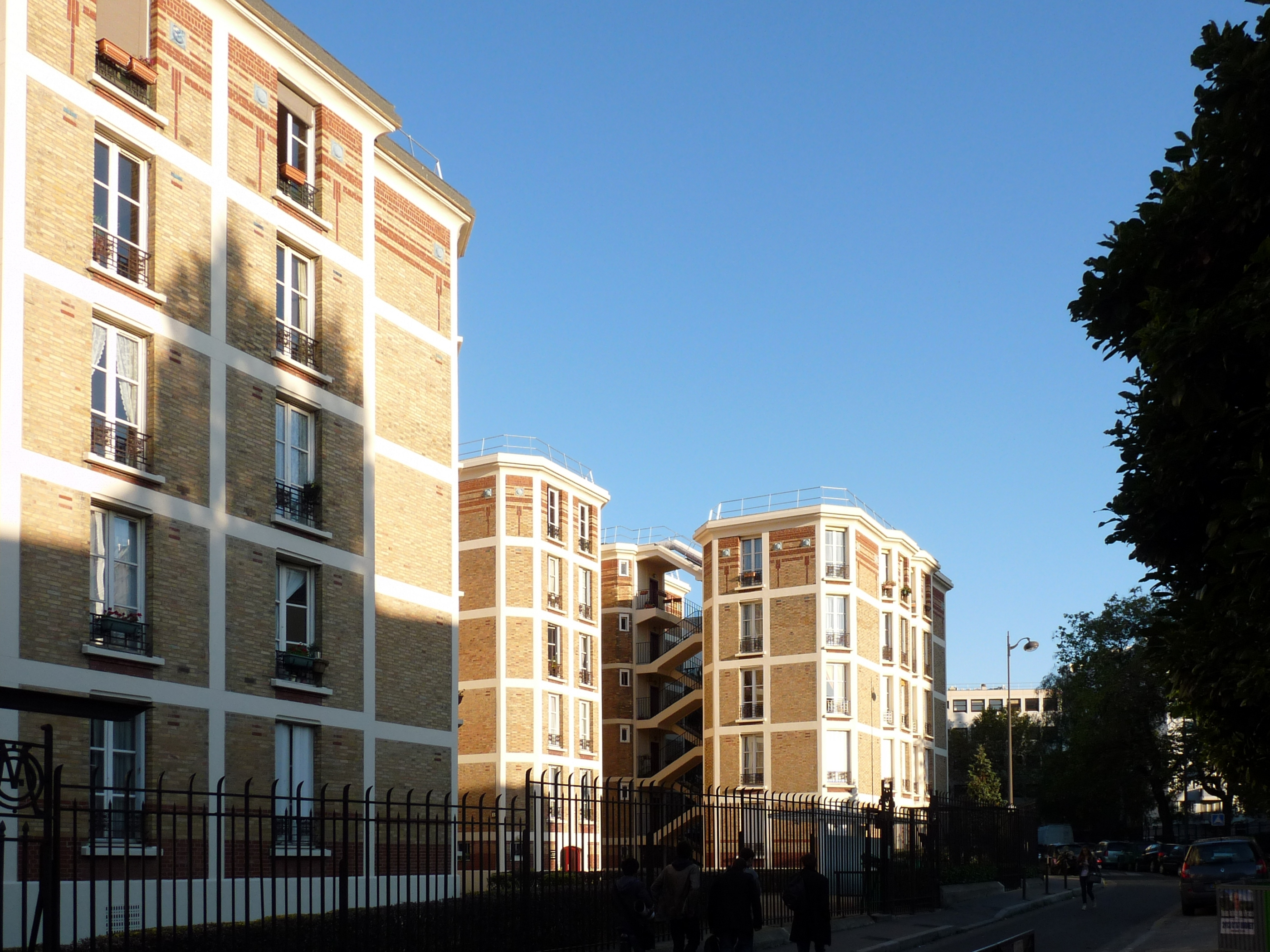
A recent Paris HLM on rue de la Saïda in the 15th arrondissement

Cathédrale orthodoxe russe de la Sainte-Trinité by Jean-Michel Wilmotte (2013–16)

=== Supermodernism ===
A notable new style of French architecture, called Supermodernism by critic Hans Ibeling, gives precedence to the visual sensations, spatial and tactile, of the viewer looking at the façade. The best-known architects in this school are Jean Nouvel and Dominique Perrault.

- The Hôtel Berlier (1986–89) by Dominique Perrault, an office building at 26-34 rue Bruneseau in the 13th arrondissement, is a block of glass, whose structure is nearly invisible. Perrault also designed the new French National Library.
- The headquarters of the newspaper Le Monde at 74–84 boulevard August-Blanqui in the 13th arrondissement, designed by Christian de Portzamparc (2005), has a façade that resembles the front page of the newspaper.
- The administration building of the French Ministry of Culture at 182 rue Saint-Honoré (2002–04), by Francis Soler and Frédéric Druot, is an older structure whose façade is completely covered with an ornamental metal mesh.
- The Hôtel Fouquet's Barrière at 2 rue Vernet, 23 rue Quentin-Bauchart and 46 avenue George-V, in the 8th arrondissement, designed by Édouard François, is covered by a skin of concrete which is a molding of the façade of an historic neighboring building.

=== Ecological architecture ===
One important theme of early-21st-century Paris architecture was making buildings that were ecologically friendly.

- The "Flower-Tower" built in 2004 by Édouard François, located at 23 rue-Albert-Roussel in the 17th arrondissement, is covered with the living foliage of bamboo plants, placed in concrete pots at the edges of the terraces on each floor, and watered automatically.
- The façade of the university restaurant building at 3 rue Mabillon in the 6th arrondissement, built in 1954, was recovered by architect Patrick Mauger with the logs of trees, to provide better thermal isolation.
- A public housing hostel for the homeless, the Centre d'hebergement Emmaüs, designed by Emmanuel Saadi in 2011, located at 179 quai de Valmy in the 10th arrondissement, is entirely covered by photo-voltaic panels for generating solar electricity.

=== Conversions ===
Another important theme in 21st-century Parisian architecture is the conversion of older industrial or commercial buildings for new purposes, called in French "reconversions" or "transcriptions".

- A large grain warehouse and flour mill in the 13th arrondissement were converted between 2002 and 2007 into buildings for the Paris Diderot University campus. The architects were Nicolas Michelin and Rudy Ricciotti.
- Les Docks, a large warehouse structure built before World War I alongside the Seine at 34 quai d'Austerlitz, was converted 2005–08 into the City of Fashion and Design, by means of a "plug-over" of ramps, stairways and passages. The architects were Jakob + MacFarlane.

=== Public housing ===
Since the 1980s the more recent constructions of HLMs, or public housing, in Paris have tried to avoid the massive and monotonous structures of the past, with more picturesque architectural detail, variety of styles, greater use of color, and large complexes broken into smaller mini-neighborhoods. The new style, called fragmentation, was particularly pioneered by architects Christian de Portzamparc and Frédéric Borel. In one complex on rue Pierre-Rebière in the 17th arrondissement the 180 residences were designed by nine different teams of architects.

== See also ==
- French architecture
- Concours de façades de la ville de Paris
- Architecture of the Paris Métro
- List of monuments historiques in Paris
- list of historic churches in Paris
- List of tallest buildings and structures in the Paris region
- Neoclassicism in France
- French Restoration style
- List of Parisian structures commissioned by Napoleon I
