= Art Nouveau in Paris =

Local implementation of a style of architecture and design

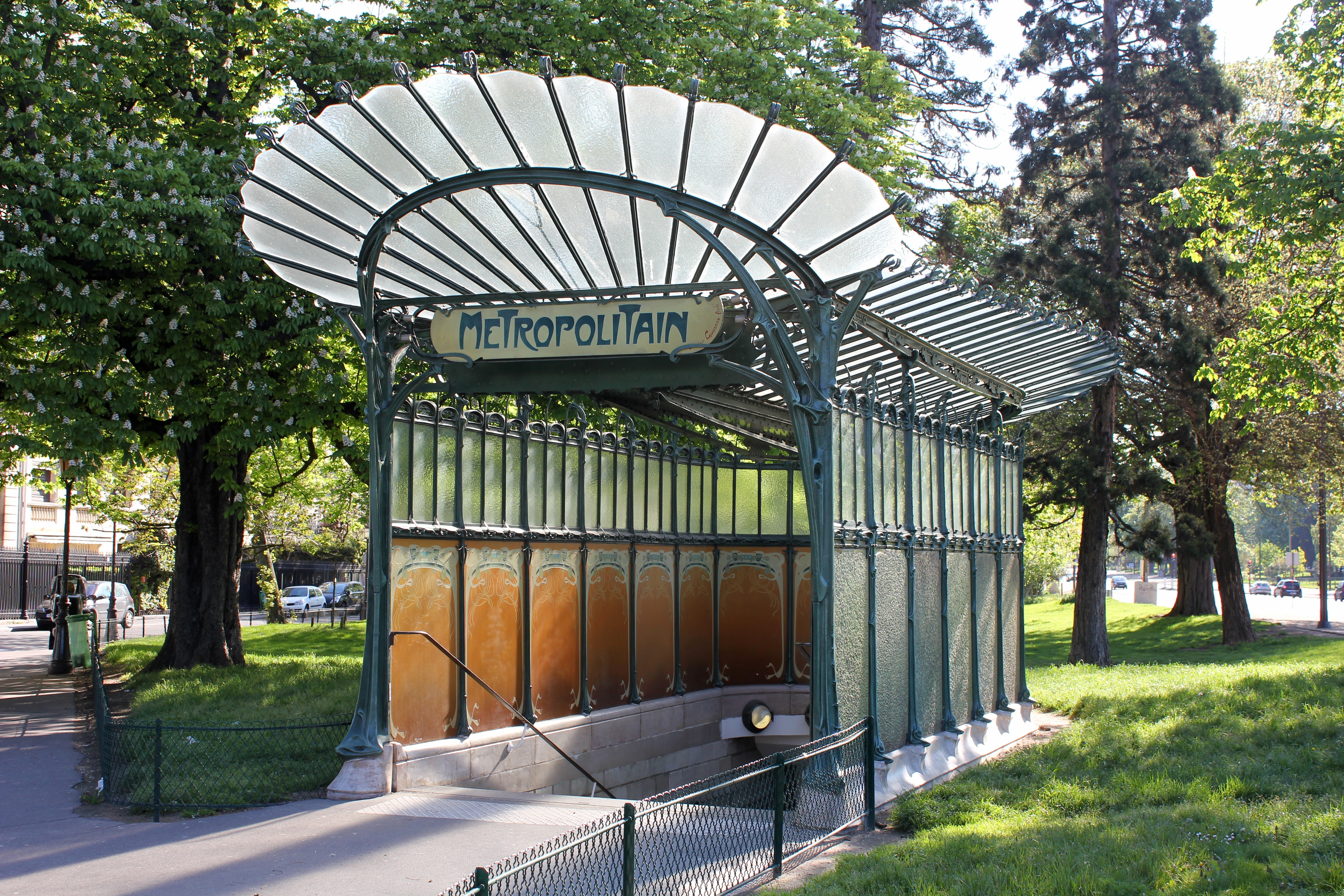
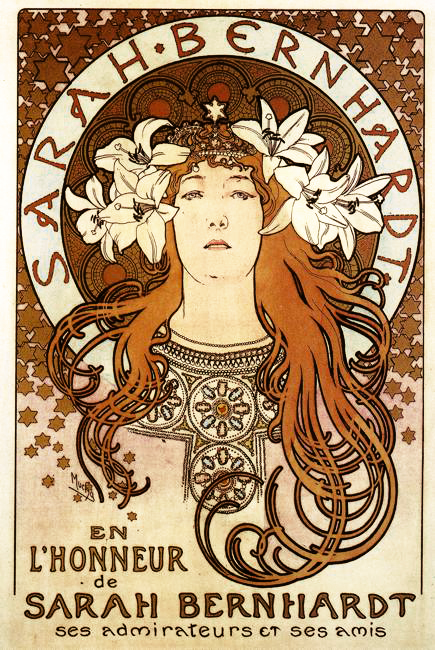
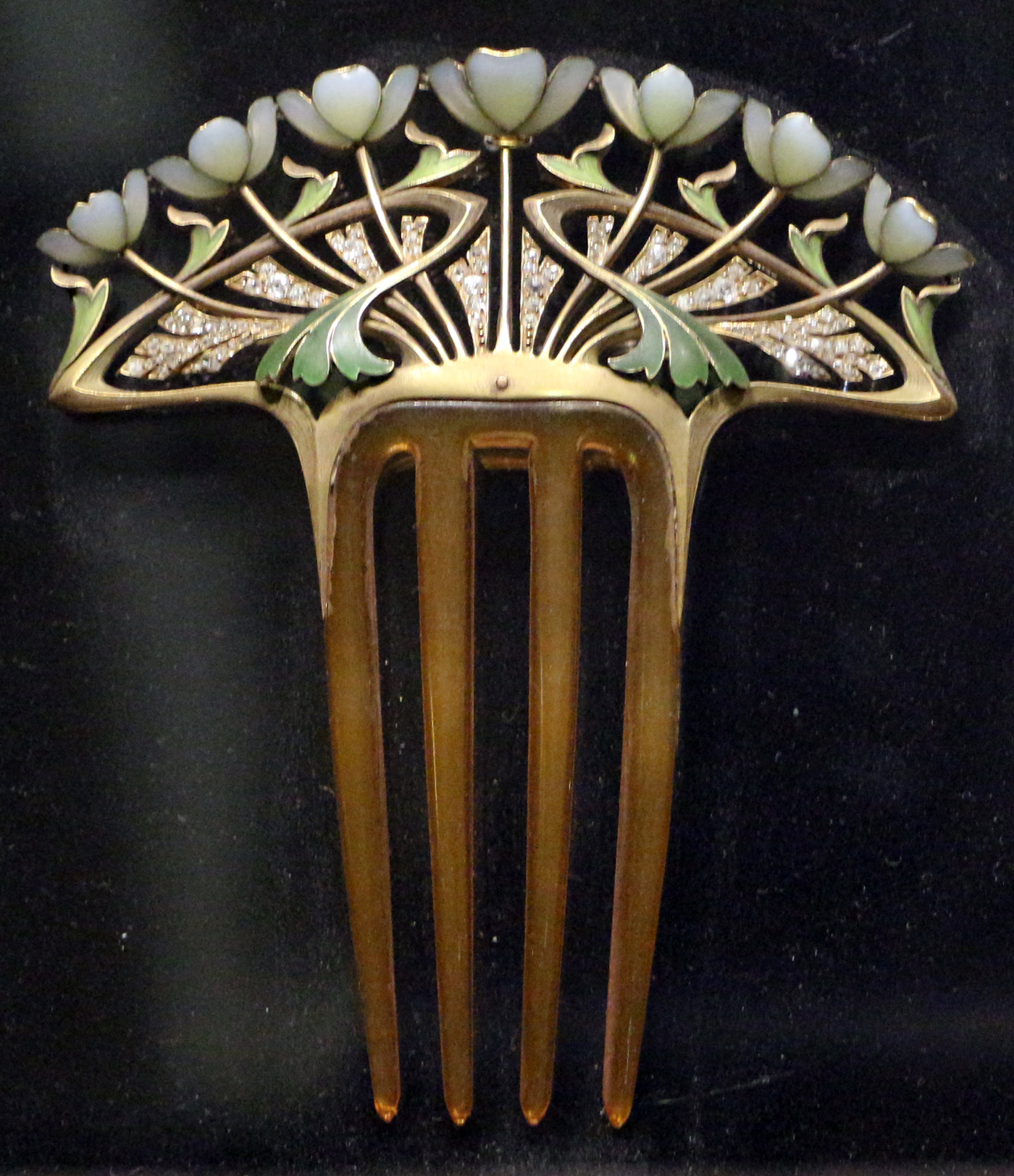
- Top: Edicule of the Porte Dauphine métro station entrance designed by Hector Guimard (1900): Poster of Sarah Berhardt by Alphonse Mucha; Jewelry by René Lalique (1902);
- Years active: c. 1895–1910
- Location: France

The Art Nouveau movement of architecture and design flourished in Paris from about 1895 to 1914, reaching its high point at the 1900 Paris International Exposition. with the Art Nouveau metro stations designed by Hector Guimard. It was characterized by a rejection of historicism and traditional architectural forms, and a flamboyant use of floral and vegetal designs, sinuous curving lines such as the whiplash line, and asymmetry. It was most prominent in architecture, appearing in department stores, apartment buildings, and churches, and in the decorative arts, particularly glassware, furniture, and jewelry. Besides Guimard, major artists included René Lalique in glassware, Louis Majorelle in furniture, and Alphonse Mucha in graphic arts, It spread quickly to other countries, but lost favor after 1910 and came to an end with the First World War.

== History ==
=== The Maison de l'Art Nouveau (1895) ===
Art Nouveau had first appeared in Brussels, in houses completed in 1893 by Victor Horta, Paul Hankar, and Henry van de Velde, but it quickly appeared in other forms in Paris. It was introduced by the Franco-German art dealer and publisher Siegfried Bing, who wished to break down the barriers between traditional museum art and decorative art. In 1891, he had founded a magazine devoted to the art of Japan, which helped publicize Japonism in Europe. In 1892, he organized an exhibit of seven artists, among them Pierre Bonnard, Félix Vallotton, Édouard Vuillard, Toulouse-Lautrec and Eugène Grasset which included both more traditional gallery paintings and paintings designed especially for decoration. The Swiss–French artist Grasset was already making early posters in the Art Nouveau style in 1893.

In 1895, Bing opened a new gallery at 22 rue de Provence in Paris, the Maison de l'Art Nouveau, devoted to works in both the fine and decorative arts. The interior and furniture of the gallery were designed by the Belgian architect Henry van de Velde. The Maison de l'Art Nouveau showed paintings by Georges Seurat, Paul Signac and Toulouse-Lautrec, glass from Louis Comfort Tiffany and Émile Gallé, jewelry by René Lalique, and posters by Aubrey Beardsley. Bing wrote in 1902, "Art Nouveau, at the time of its creation, did not aspire in any way to have the honor of becoming a generic term. It was simply the name of a house opened as a rallying point for all the young and ardent artists impatient to show the modernity of their tendencies."

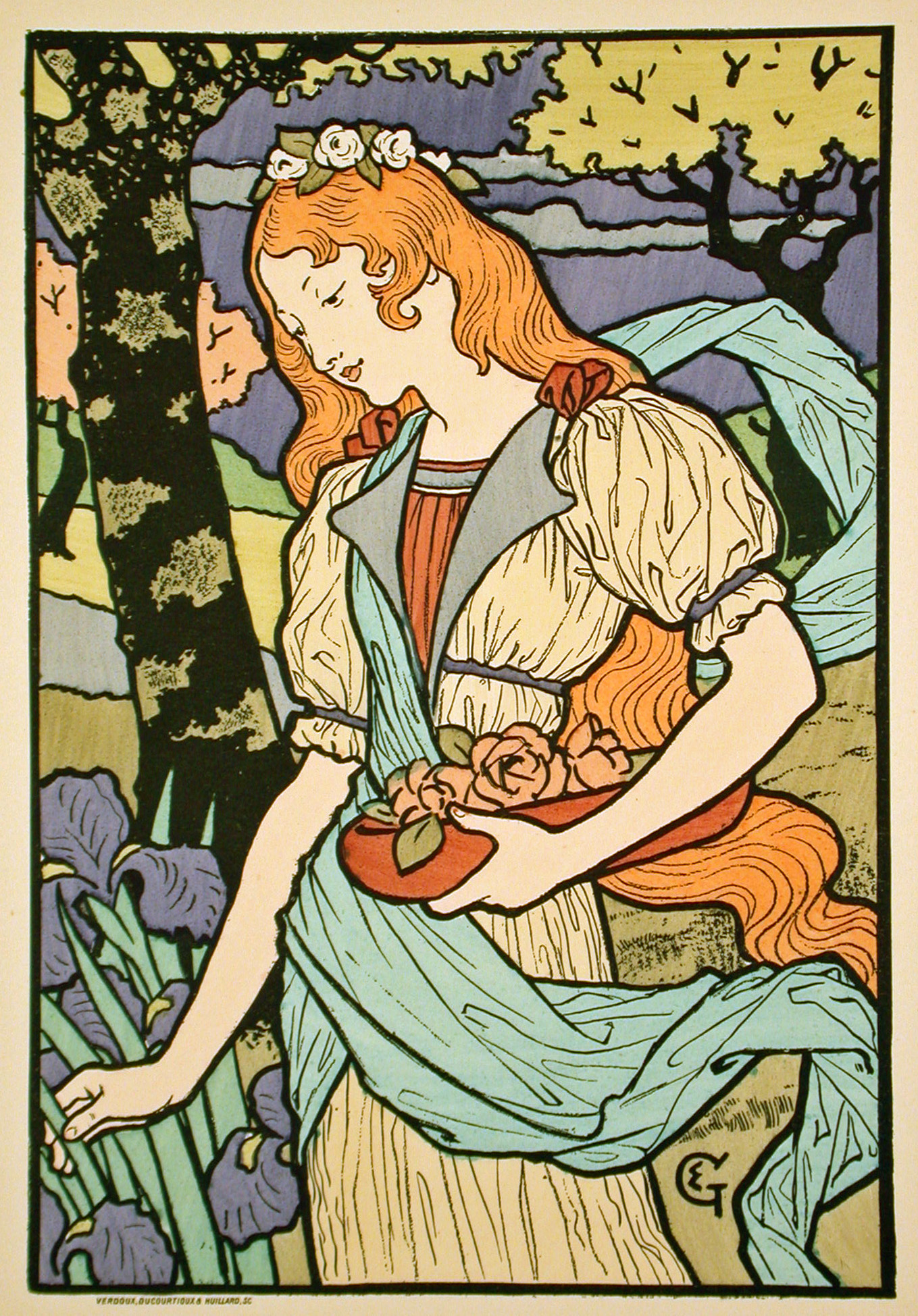
Poster by Eugène Grasset for Grafton Galleries (1893)

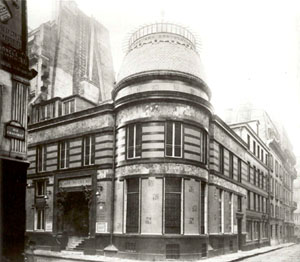
Maison de l'Art Nouveau (1895) at 22 Rue de Provence, 9th arrondissement (1895)

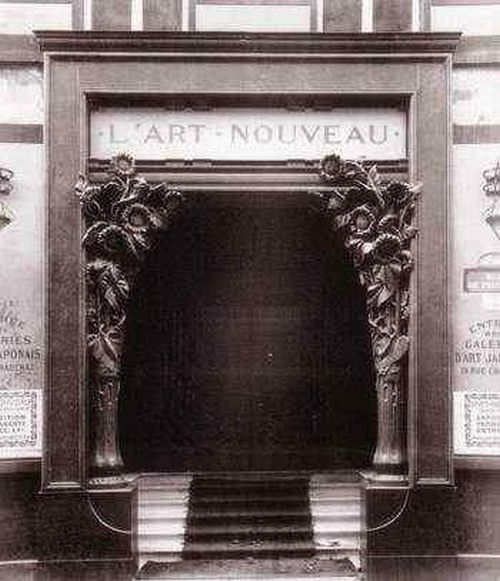
The Maison de l'Art Nouveau gallery of Siegfried Bing

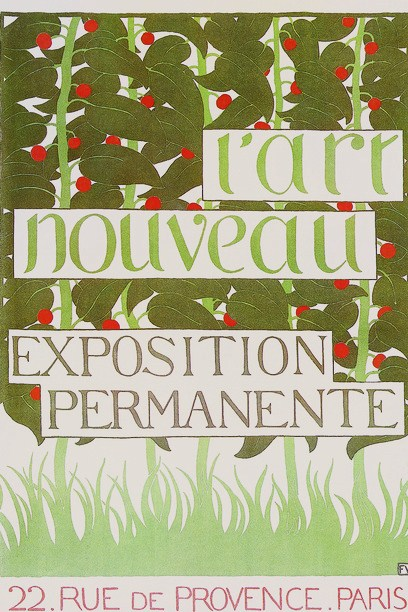
Poster by Félix Vallotton for the new Maison de l'Art Nouveau (1896)

=== A change in the municipal laws and the Facade competition (1898–1902) ===
One great limitation on the architecture of Paris at the end of the 19th century was a law, dating to the 1607 but still in effect in 1900, limitling the height and ornament on the facades and forbidding any elements of architecture that protruded over the sidewalk below. This was done to allow greater light to the narrow streets and to prevent pieces of masonry falling on the street below. Exceptions were often made, but the law greatly limited the freedom of architects.

The second great limit imposed on architects was the design system put in place by the city planner Baron Haussmann, which was immediately relaxed upon his death in 1891.

In 1897, the Administration of Paris launched a competition, first for the Rue Réaumur and subsequently extending to the entire city in 1898, awarding prizes to the six most original facades, in the Concours de façades de la ville de Paris. One of the winners in 1898 was Hector Guimard's Castel Béranger, the first Art Nouveau residence in Paris. In 1902 the director of public works of Paris, Louis Bonnier, announced a reform of the law, which followed the model of other European cities. The new rules, put into effect in 1902, used proportionality as the standard; the wider the street, the higher the buildings could be, and the more variety of architecture and ornament the architects could use on the facade.

=== The Paris Universal Exposition (1900) ===
The Paris Universal Exposition of 1900 marked the summit of Art Nouveau in Paris, bringing together many of the artists and designers who pioneered the style, and making the style known to the forty-eight million visitors to the Exposition. Art Nouveau architecture was highlighted in the interiors of the two major pavilions of fine arts, the Grand Palais and the Petit Palais. It was also prominent in the Palace of Decorative Arts, where works of Louis Majorelle and René Lalique, Daum, and other French designers were displayed. The Paris Métro, completed shortly after the Exposition opened, featured the Art Nouveau edicules designed for the stations by Hector Guimard.

== Architecture ==
=== Hector Guimard's residential buildings ===
The residential architecture of Art Nouveau or Modern Style, as it was also known, was a reaction against the electric and historical styles that dominated Paris in the Belle Époque. A majority of the buildings in the new style were constructed in the wealthy 16th arrondissement. The first was the Castel Béranger (1895–98) by Hector Guimard, built shortly after he visited Brussels, met Paul Hankar and toured the Hôtel Tassel, the town house completed by Victor Horta in 1893, and which had a major impact on his style. Many of the details of the Castel Béranger were Neo-Gothic in inspiration, including the gable windows and rain gutters. It was assembled with a multitude of materials and colors, including stone, brick, and iron, and with a boldness of imagination, including curling vegetal and floral designs in wrought iron decoration around the doors and windows. The building won the competition for the best facade in Paris in 1898, and, along with his own astute marketing, launched Guimard's career. He became the most famous of Art Nouveau architects.

Late in the period, between 1909 and 1912, Guimard designed a residence and studio for himself, as well as a painting studio for his wife. the Hôtel Guimard at 122 Avenue Mozart (16th arrondissement). This building represented his less exuberant and more refined later style, as did the Hôtel Mezzara (1910), (60, rue de La Fontaine, (16th).

Other notable Guimard buildings in Paris include the early Hôtel Delfau (1895), at Rue Molitor (16th), and the later Hôtel Jassédé (1903–1905) at 142 Avenue de Versailles (16th), notable for its striking asymmetric angle on the corner. The Hôtel Mezzara, (1910) at 60 rue de La Fontaine ((16th) was more classical in style, but also had an interesting asymmetric wing and his characteristic curves, arches, and floral wrought iron designs. He also designed an Art Nouveau synagogue in 1913 (see religious buildings). He designed several other buildings just before and after World War I which were not in the Art Nouveau style.

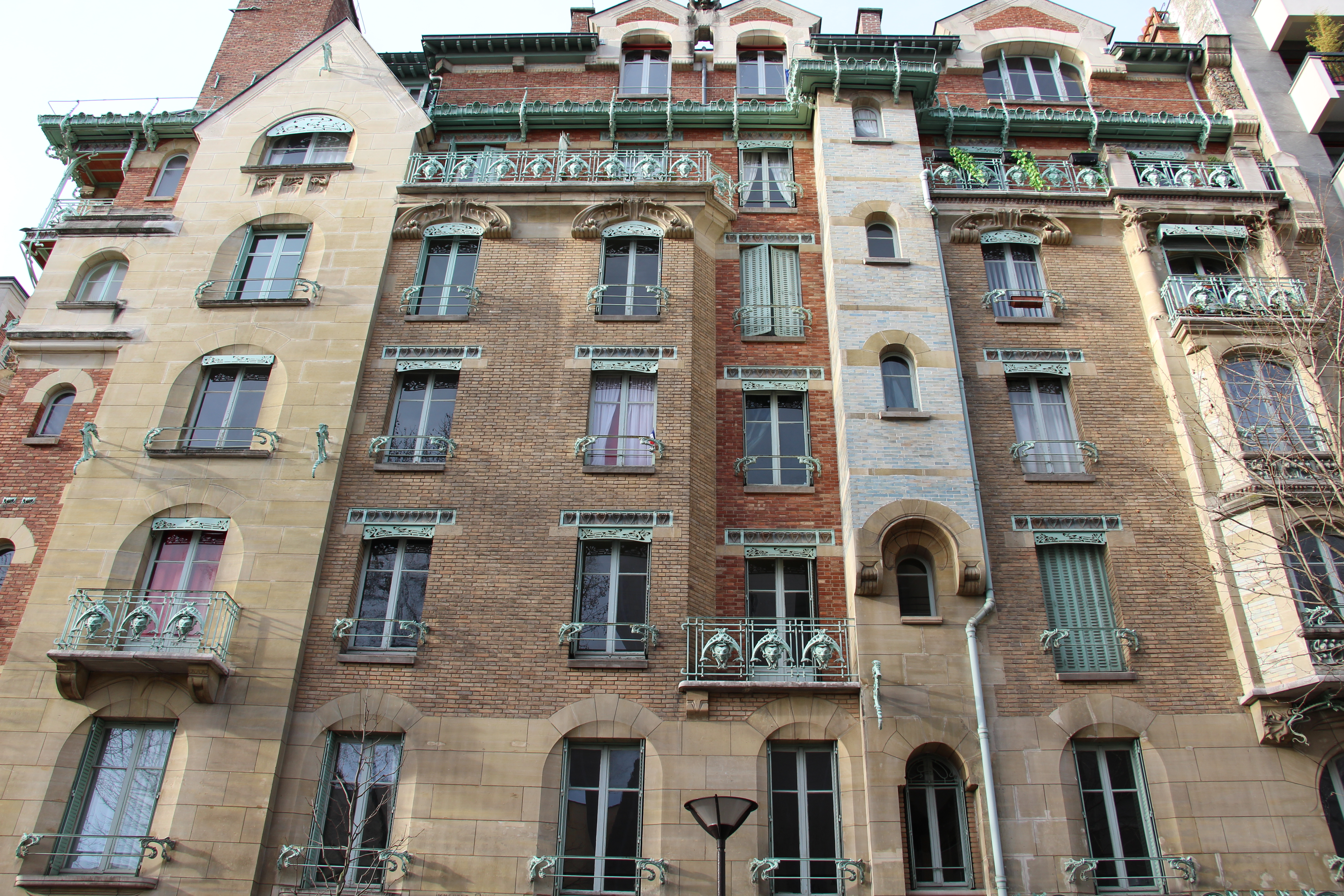
Hector Guimard, Facade of the Castel Béranger (1895–98) at 14 Rue de La Fontaine (16th Arr.)

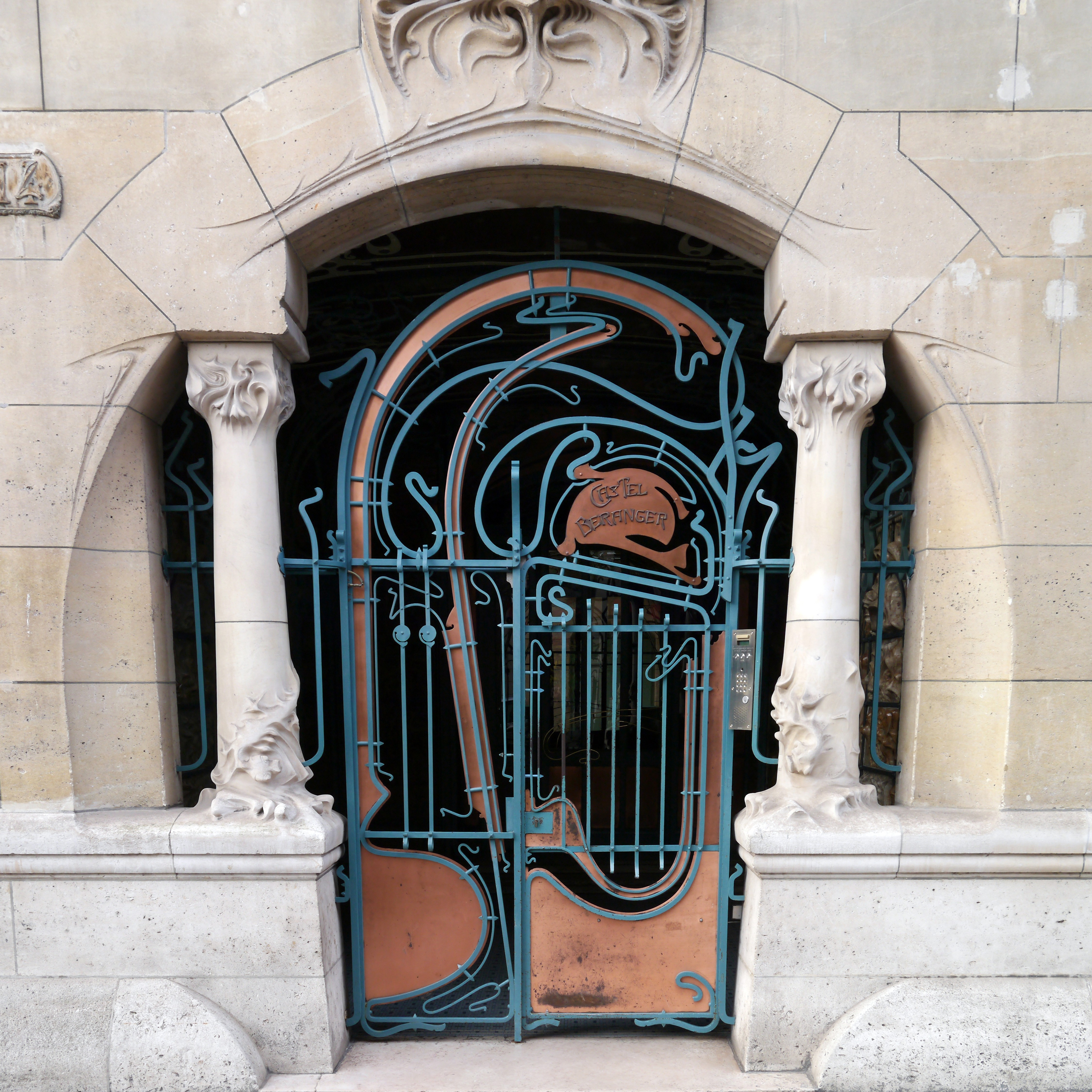
Entrance of the Castel Béranger (1895–98)

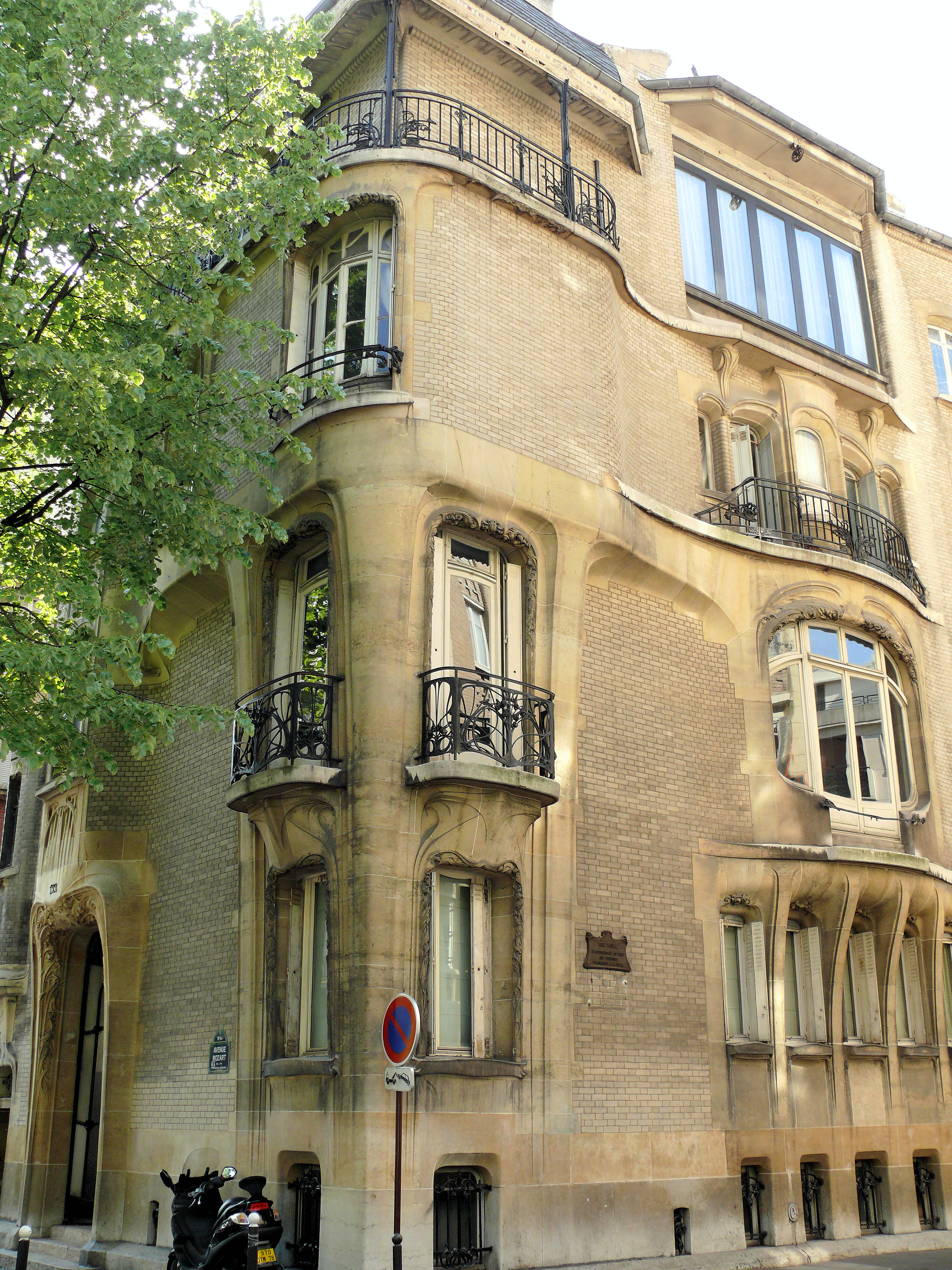
The Hôtel Guimard (1909–1912)

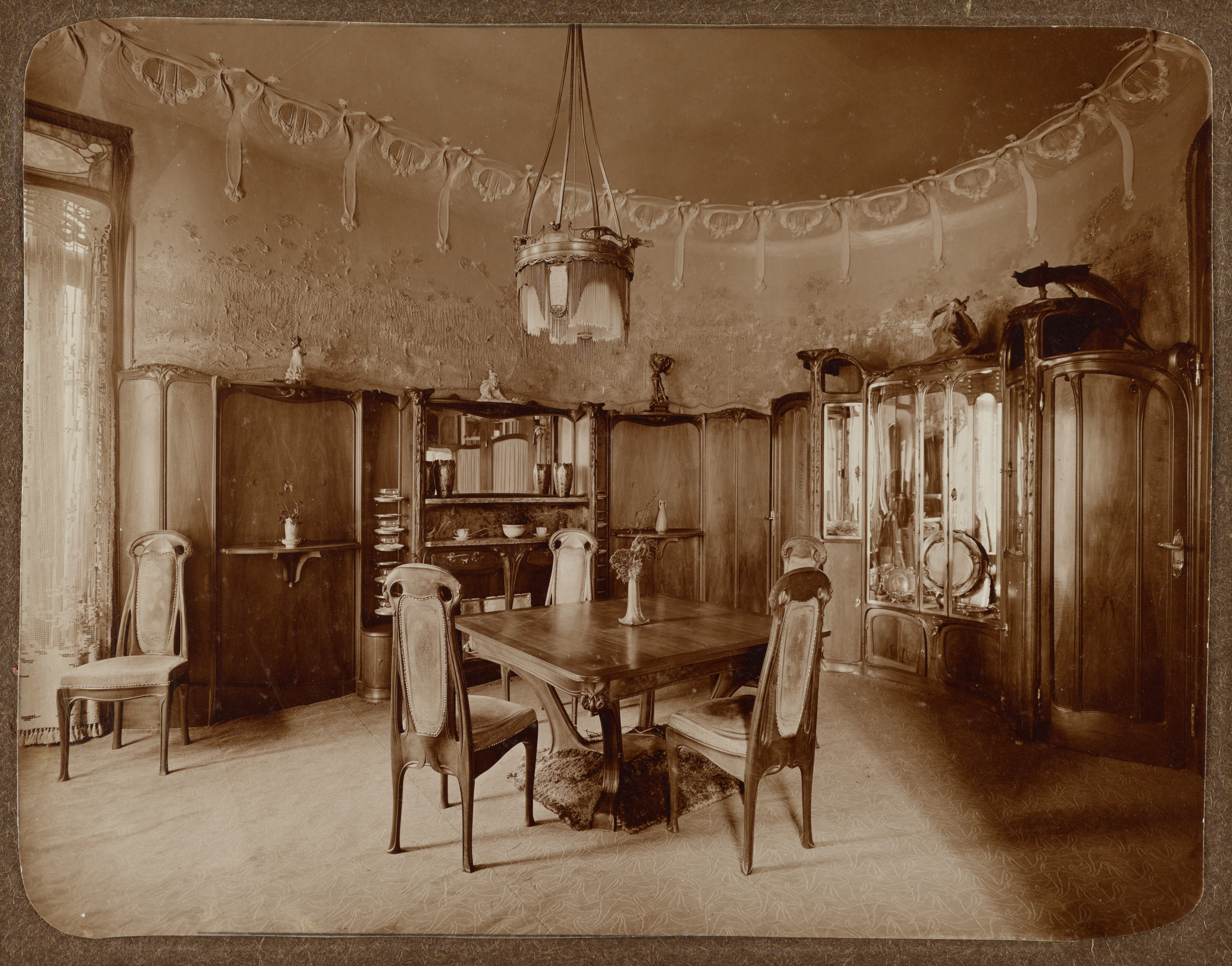
Dining room of the Hôtel Guimard (about 1910)

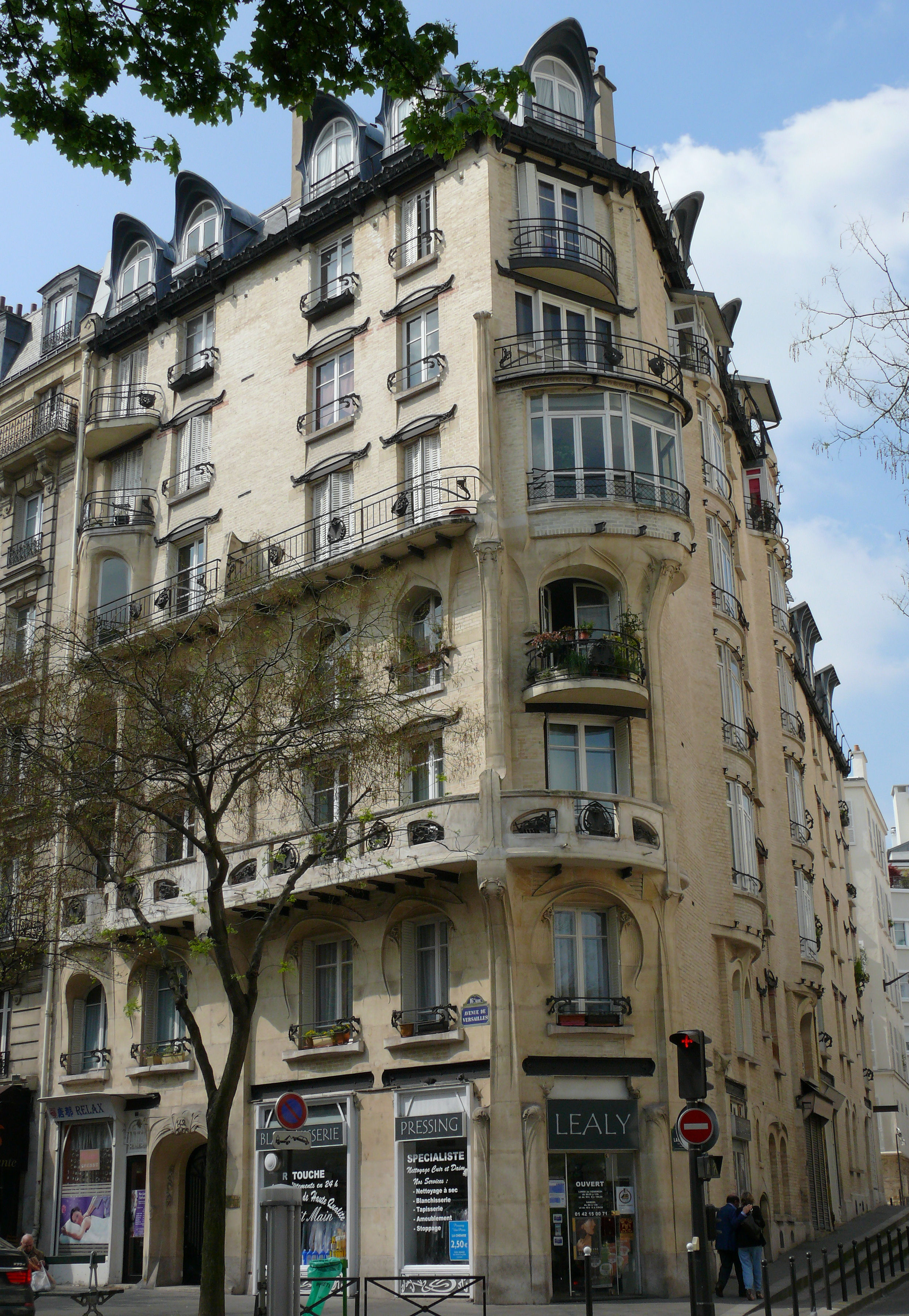
Hector Guimard, Asymmetric corner of the Jassédé building (1903–1905)

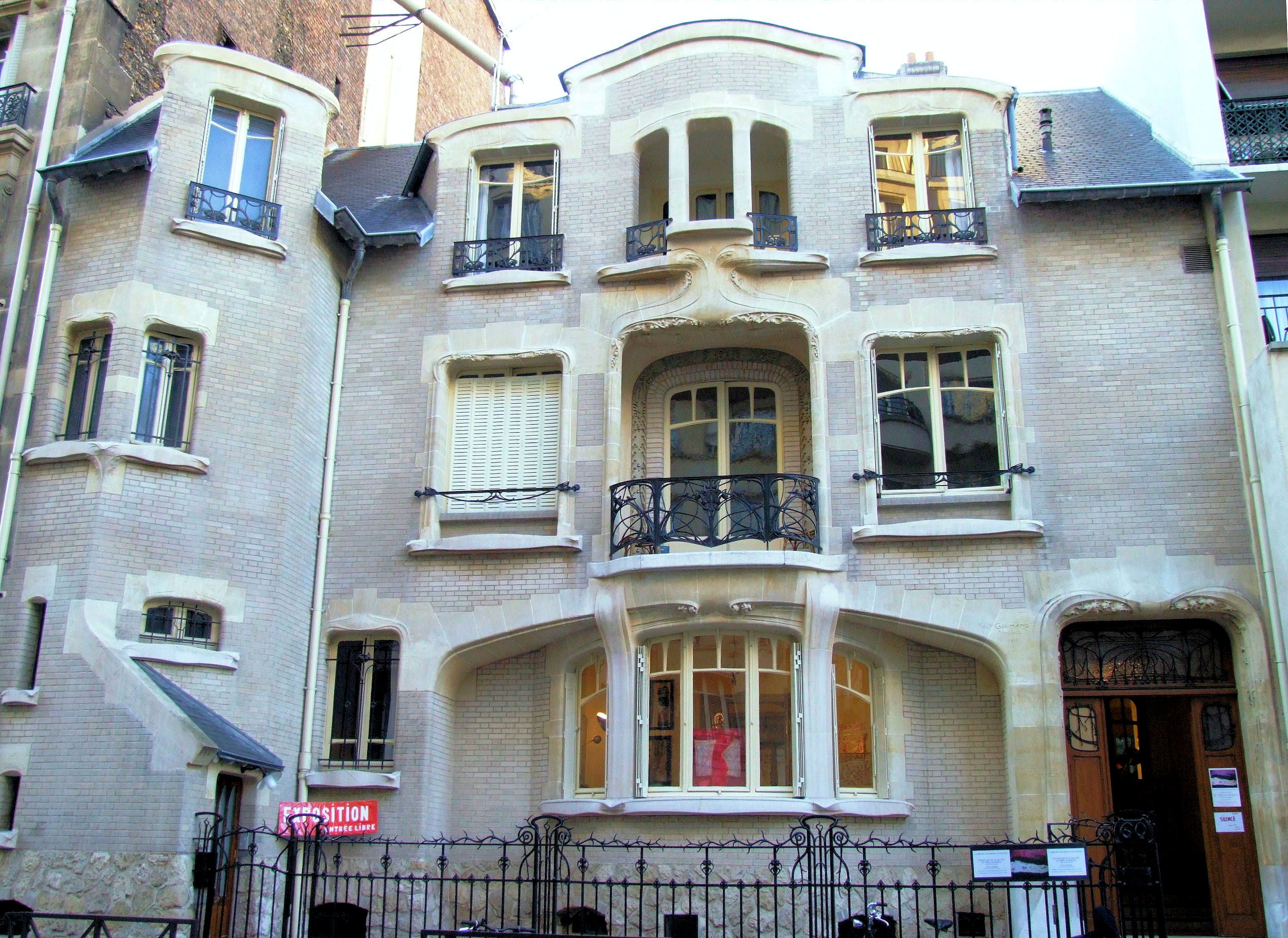
Hector Guimard, Hôtel Mezzara, 60 rue de La Fontaine ((16th)

=== Guimard's Métro stations ===
Between 1896 and 1904, Hector Guimard designed the Paris Métro station entrances, using the sinuous floral and vegetal designs that became an emblem of the style. They were prefabricated for easier installation, and one hundred and forty coverings were put into place. Most were installed in 1900. Nearly all were removed a few years later, but many were recreated in the late 20th and early 21st centuries.

Only two of the original edicules from 1900 are still in use; one is Abbesses (Paris Métro) station. It was originally at Hôtel de Ville (Paris Métro) but was moved to its present location in the 1970s. The other is at Porte Dauphine (Paris Métro). It is the only edicule still in use and still at its original location.

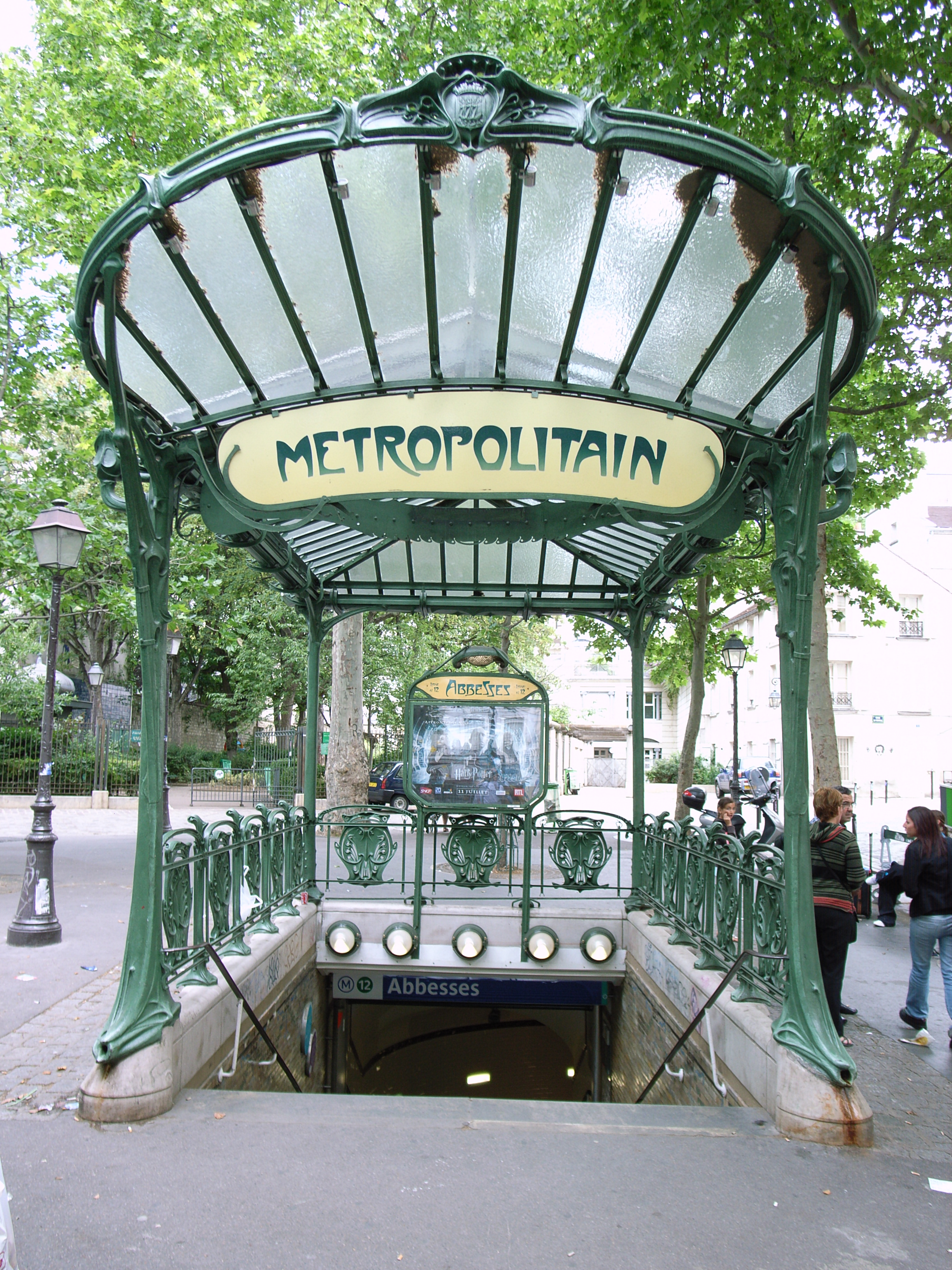
Original Edicule of Abbesses (Paris Métro) Station (1900)

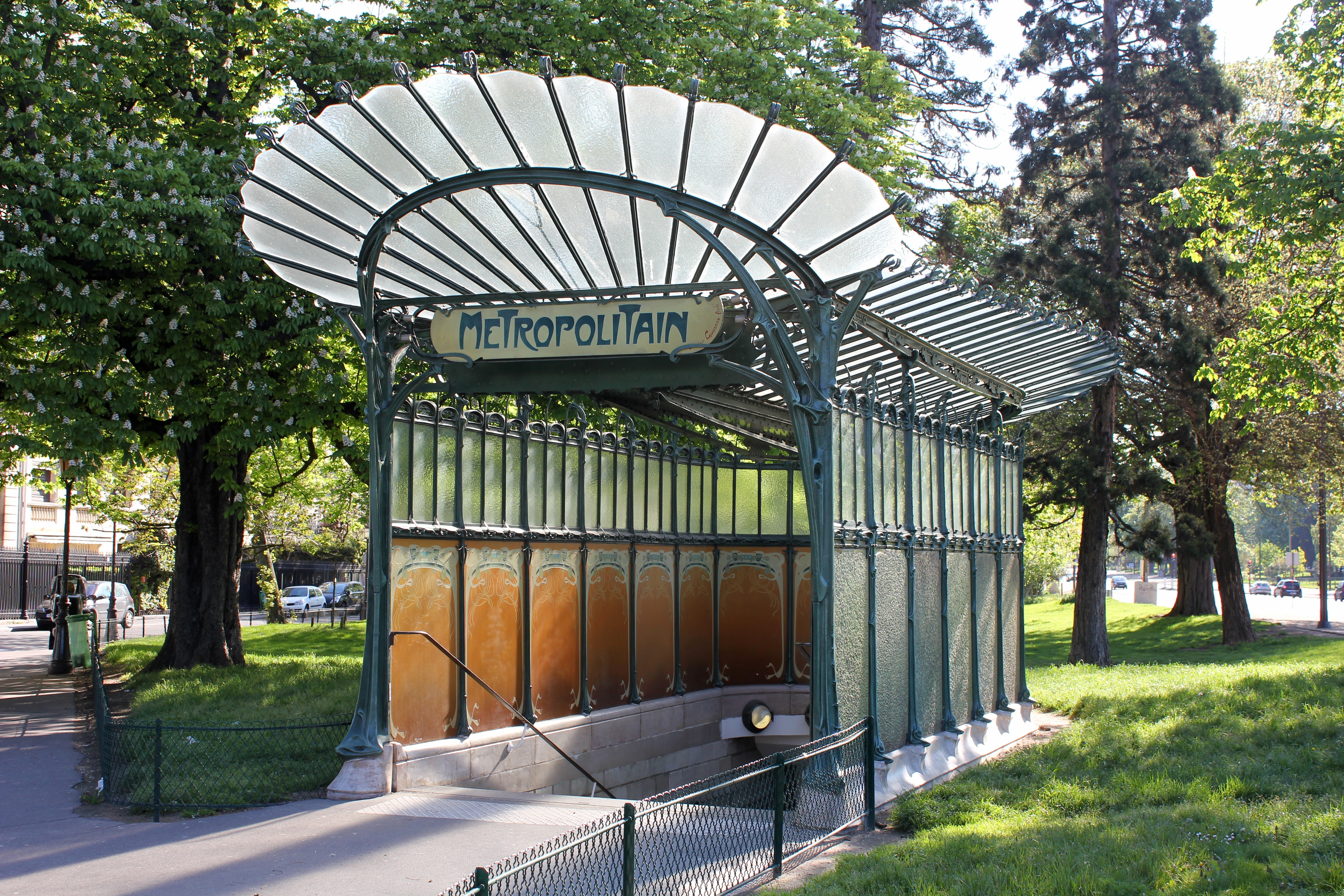
Original Edicule at Porte Dauphine (Paris Métro)(1900)

=== Jules Lavirotte and Alfred Wagon – the Ceramic facade (1901) ===
Next to Hector Guimard, the Paris architect most closely associated with Art Nouveau was Jules Lavirotte. He is best known for a group of several buildings in the 7th arrondissement, particularly the Lavirotte Building at 29 Avenue Rapp (7th arrondissement), completed in 1901, and a winner of the Paris facade competition in that same year. The particular feature of the building is the lavish ceramic sculptural ornament on the facade, which was intended as an advertisement for the Paris ceramics firm of Alexandre Bigot. Lavirotte made another extravagant facade in the same neighborhood, at 3 Square Rapp (7th arr.) and another, the so-called Ceramic Hotel on the other side of the Seine, at 34 Avenue de Wagram (8th around.) (1905) This building was a facade competition winner in 1905.

The exuberant style of Lavirotte was pushed even further by architect Alfred Wagon, who is best known for the building at 24 Place Étienne Pernet (15th arrondissement), made for a building contractor named Duroc, and covered with sculpted vegetation. It is considered one of the most extravagant examples of Art Nouveau in Paris.

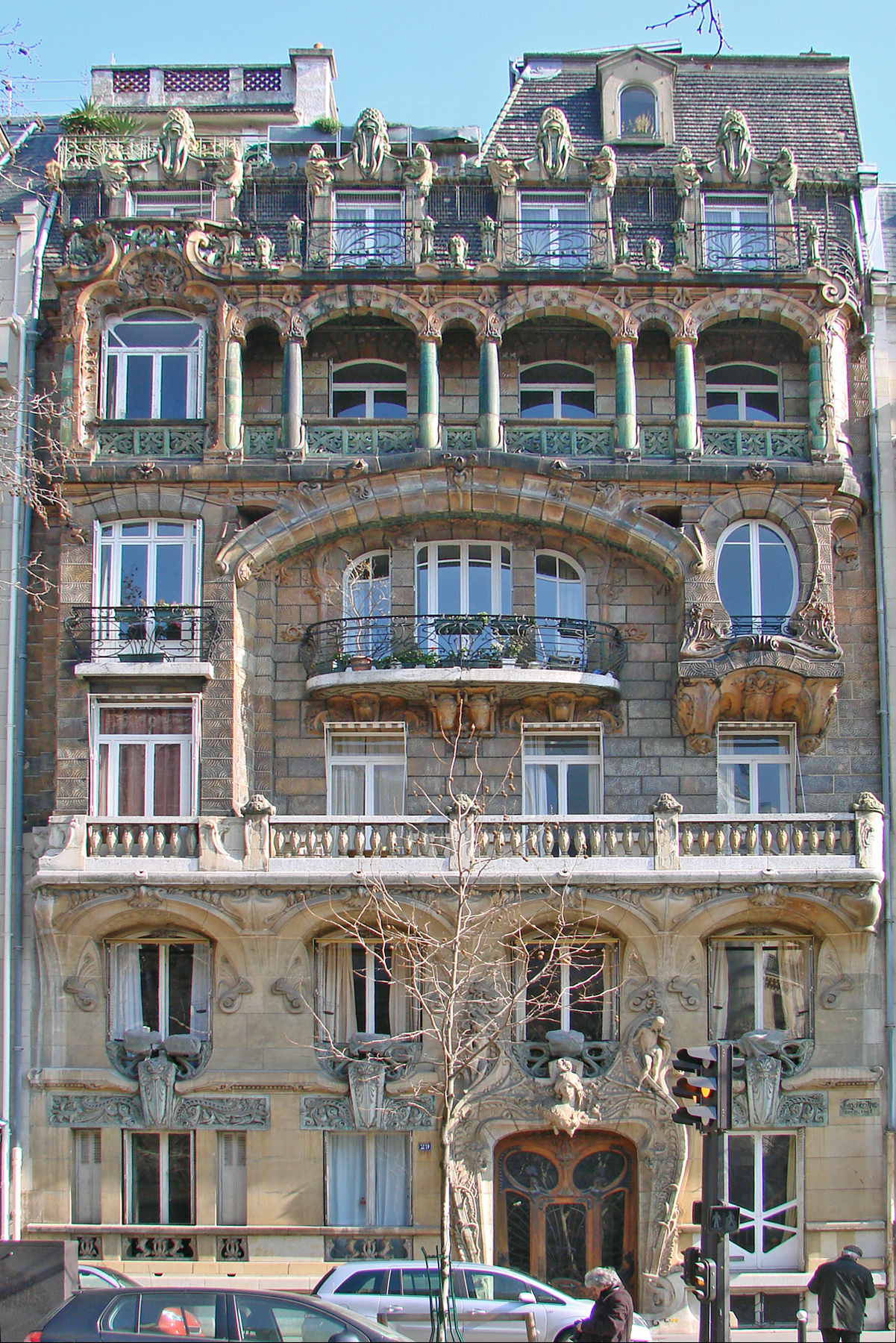
Lavirotte Building at 29 Avenue Rapp, 7th arrondissement (1901)

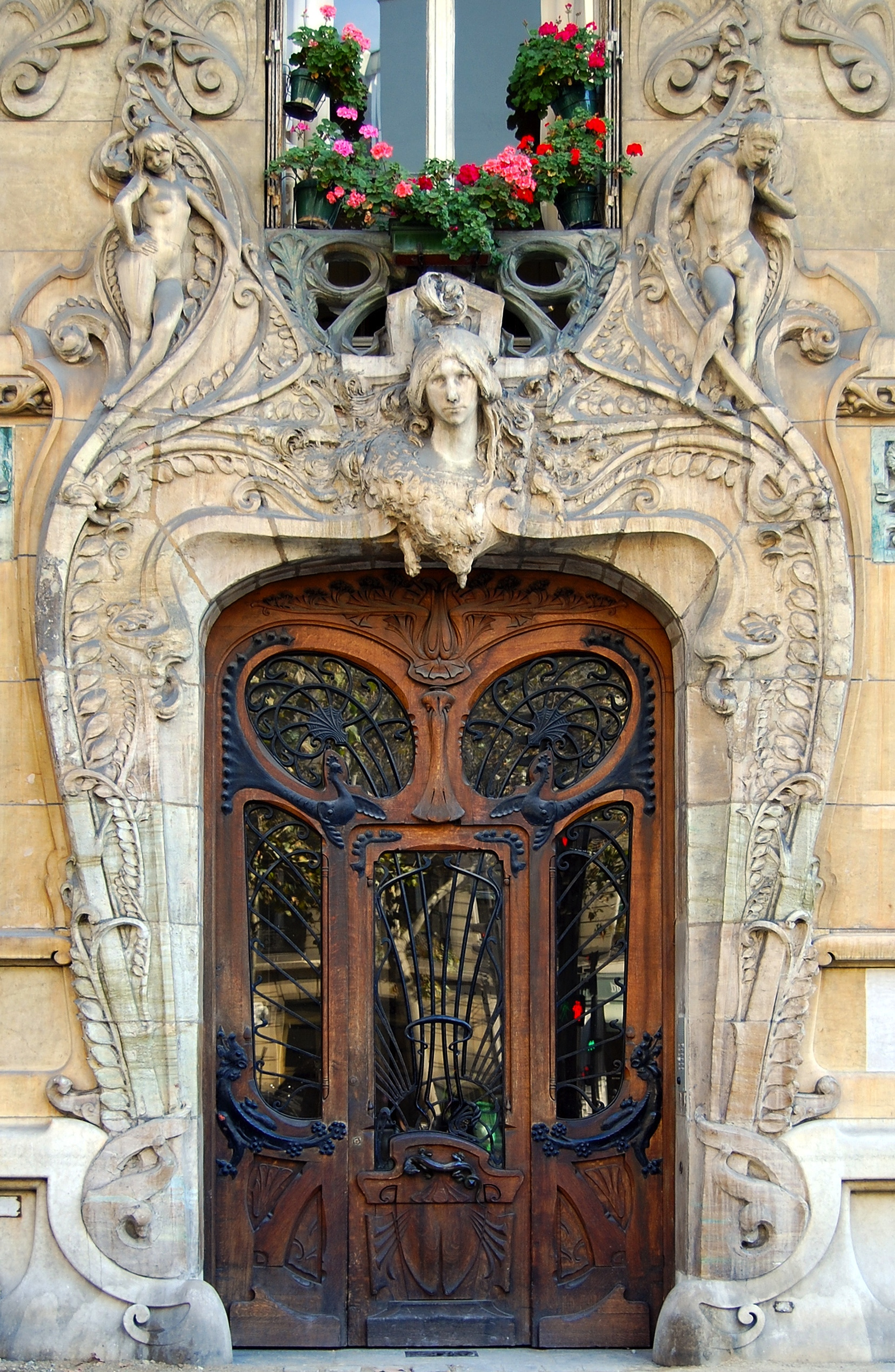
Entrance of the Lavirotte Building with ceramic sculpture (1901)

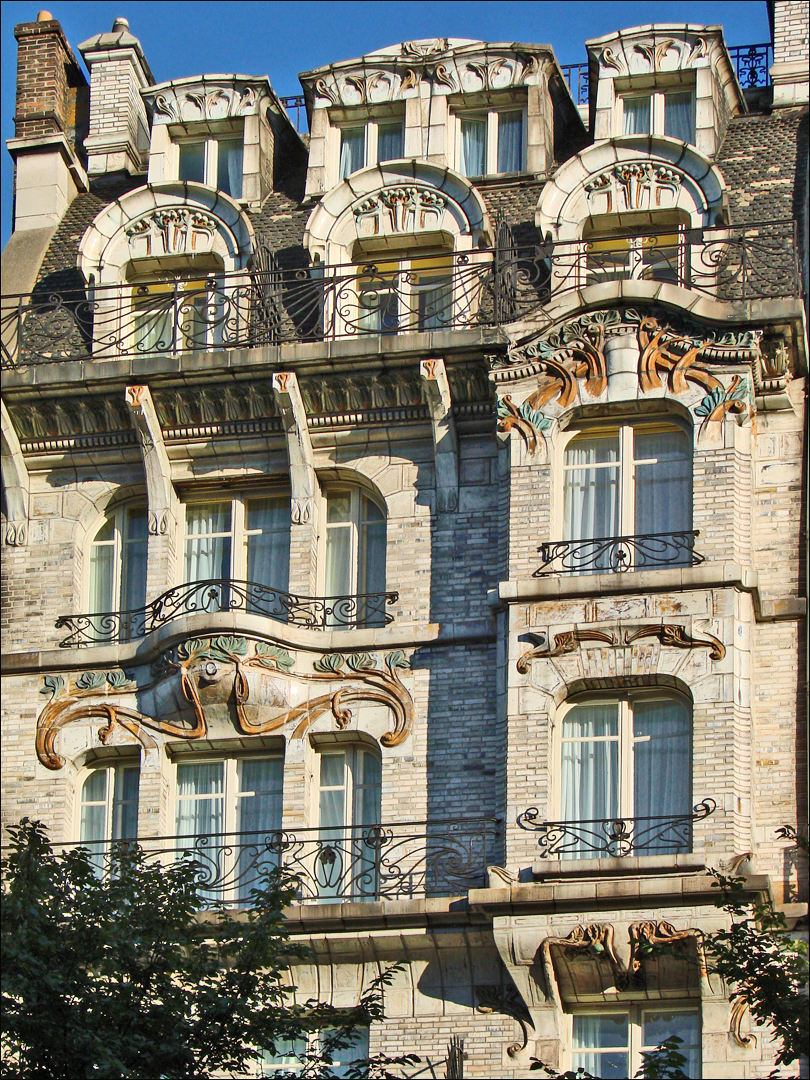
Upper facade of the Ceramic Hotel (1904)

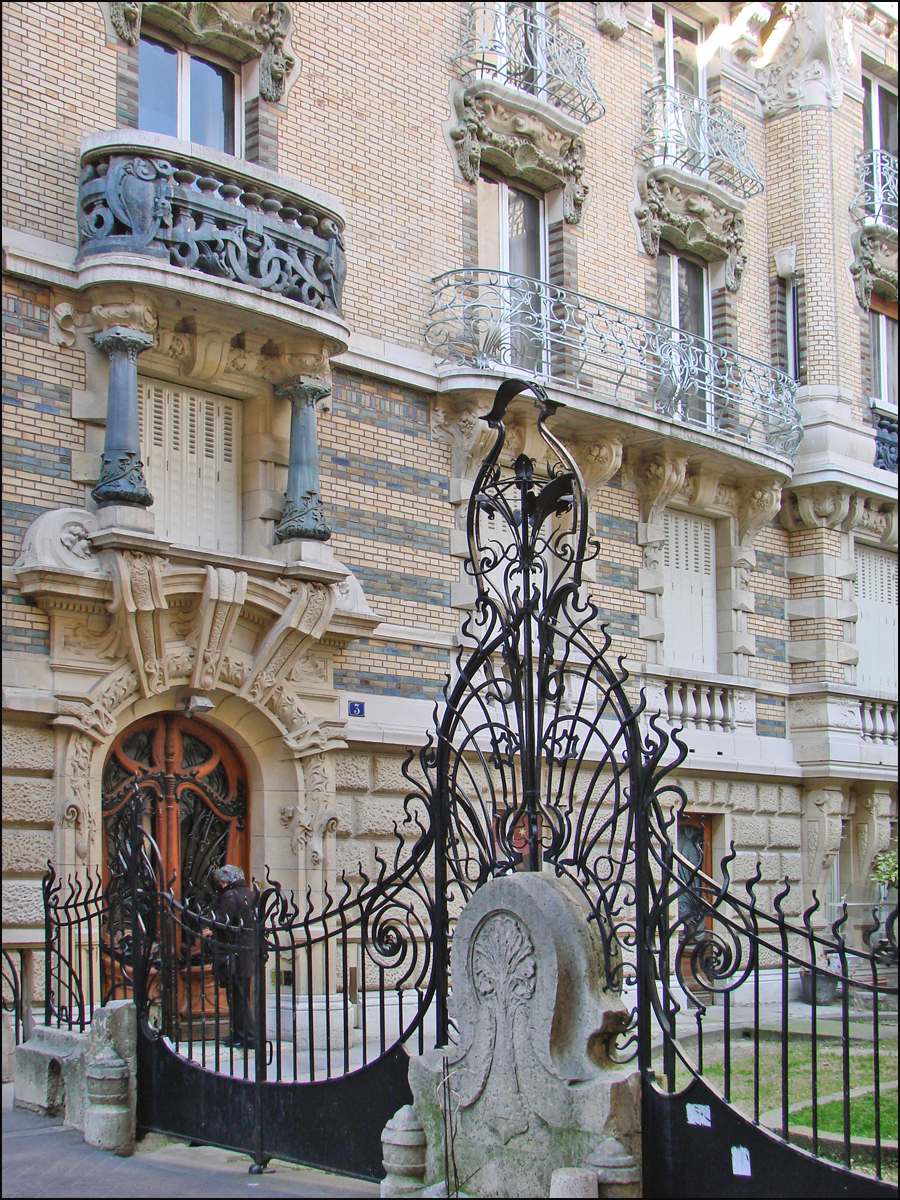
Facade of 3 Square rapp (1899–1900)

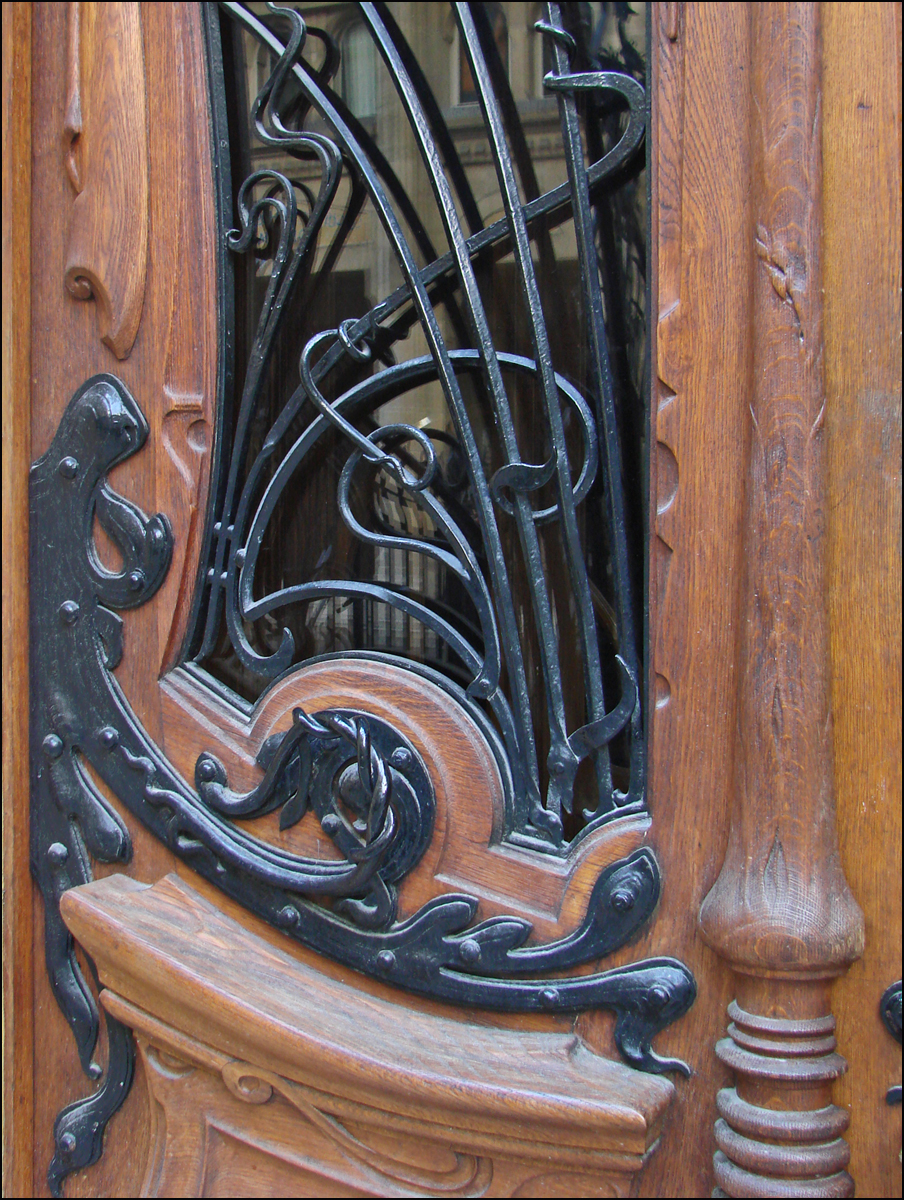
Entrance of 3 Square Rapp (1899–1900) (7th Arr.)

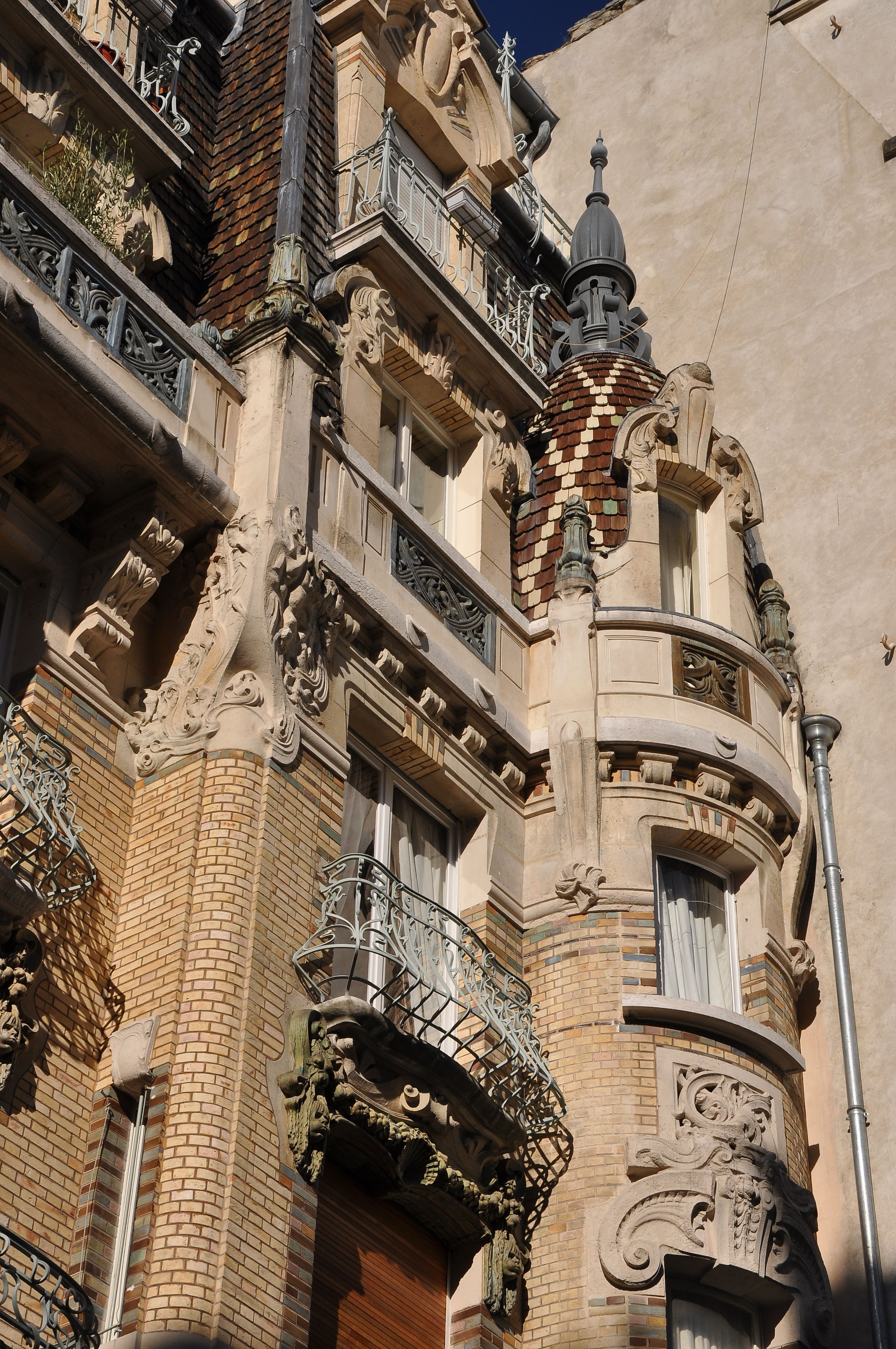
Detail of 3 Square Rapp (1899–1900)

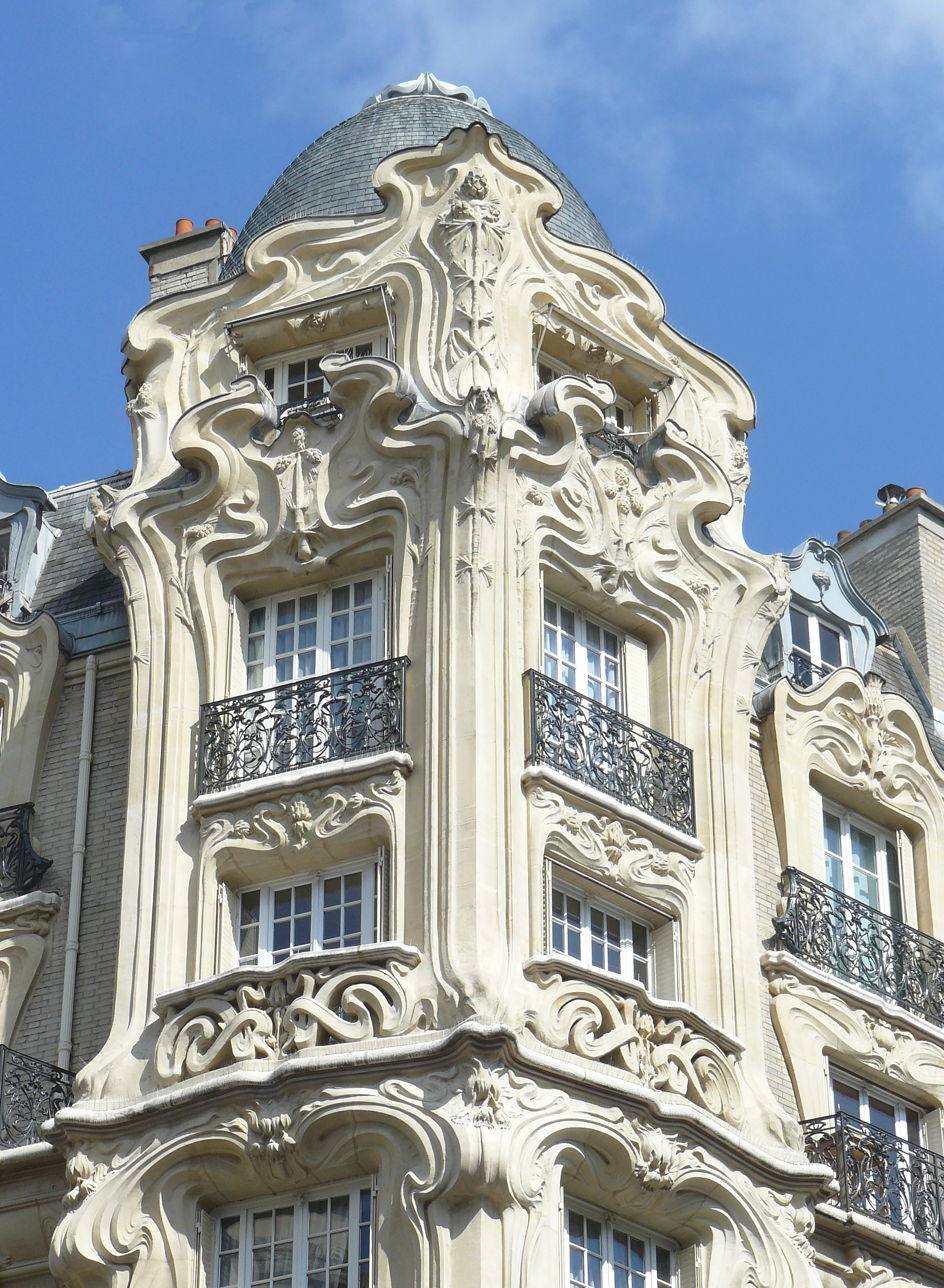
Alfred Wagon building at 24 Place Étienne Pernet, (15th around.) (1905)

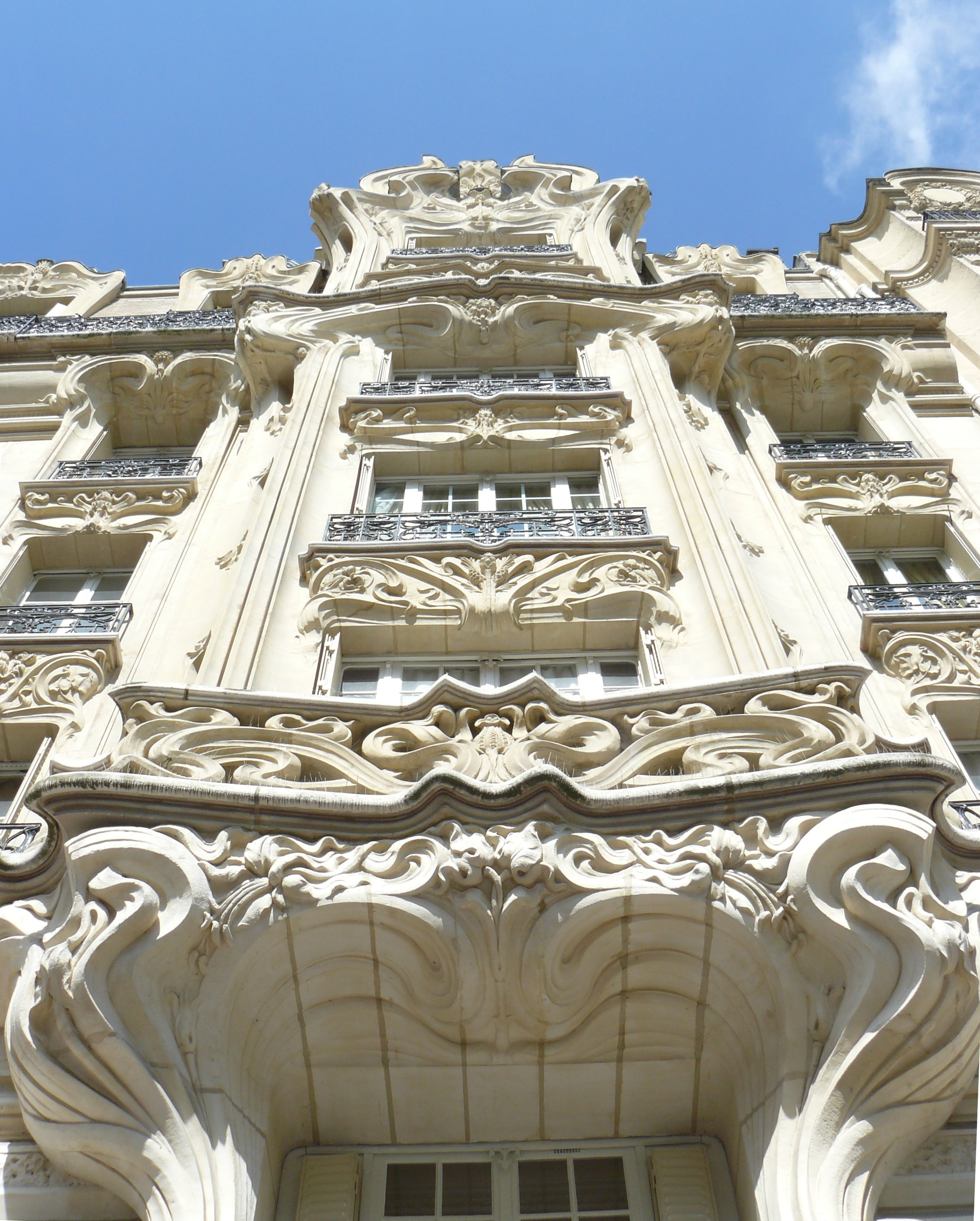
Looking upwards at the Alfred Wagon building, 24 Place Etienne Pernet (1905)

=== Office buildings ===
The architect Frantz Jourdain was best known for the La Samaritaine Department store, but also designed office buildings in the later, more moderate Art Nouveau style. It was often blended with neo-classicism and other Belle-Epoque styles. It was used by companies which wanted to show they were modern, but would not take any risks. One example is the La Semeuse Building (1912), Frantz Jourdain for the offices of La Semeuse de Paris, the financial institution that provided credit to the La Samritaine department store. Much of the building has been modernized, but the entrance features an Art Nouveau door and ironwork and stained glass windows by the architect's son.

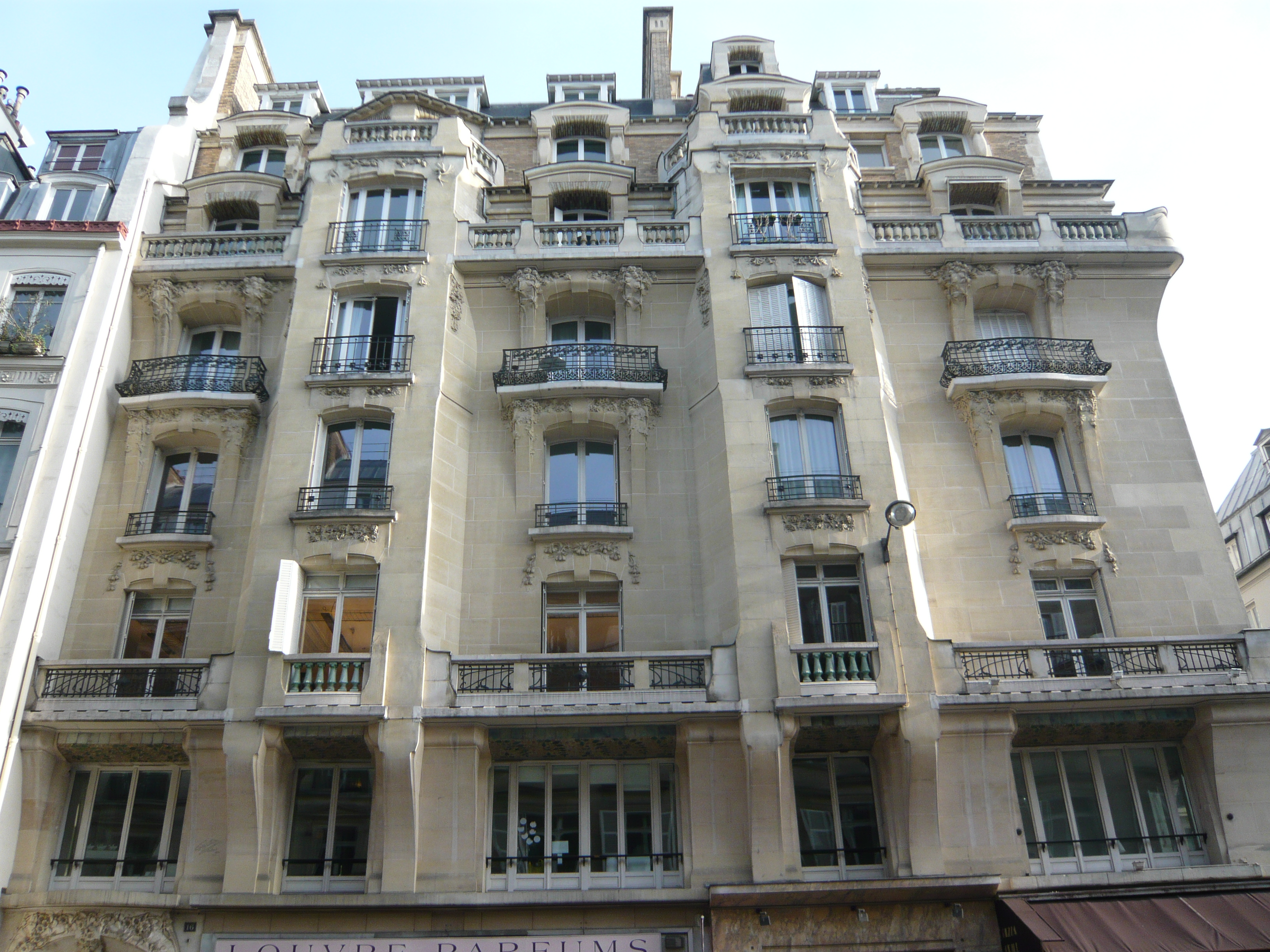
La Semeuse de Paris building, by Frantz Jourdain (1912)14–16, rue du Louvre in the 1st arrondissement. ,

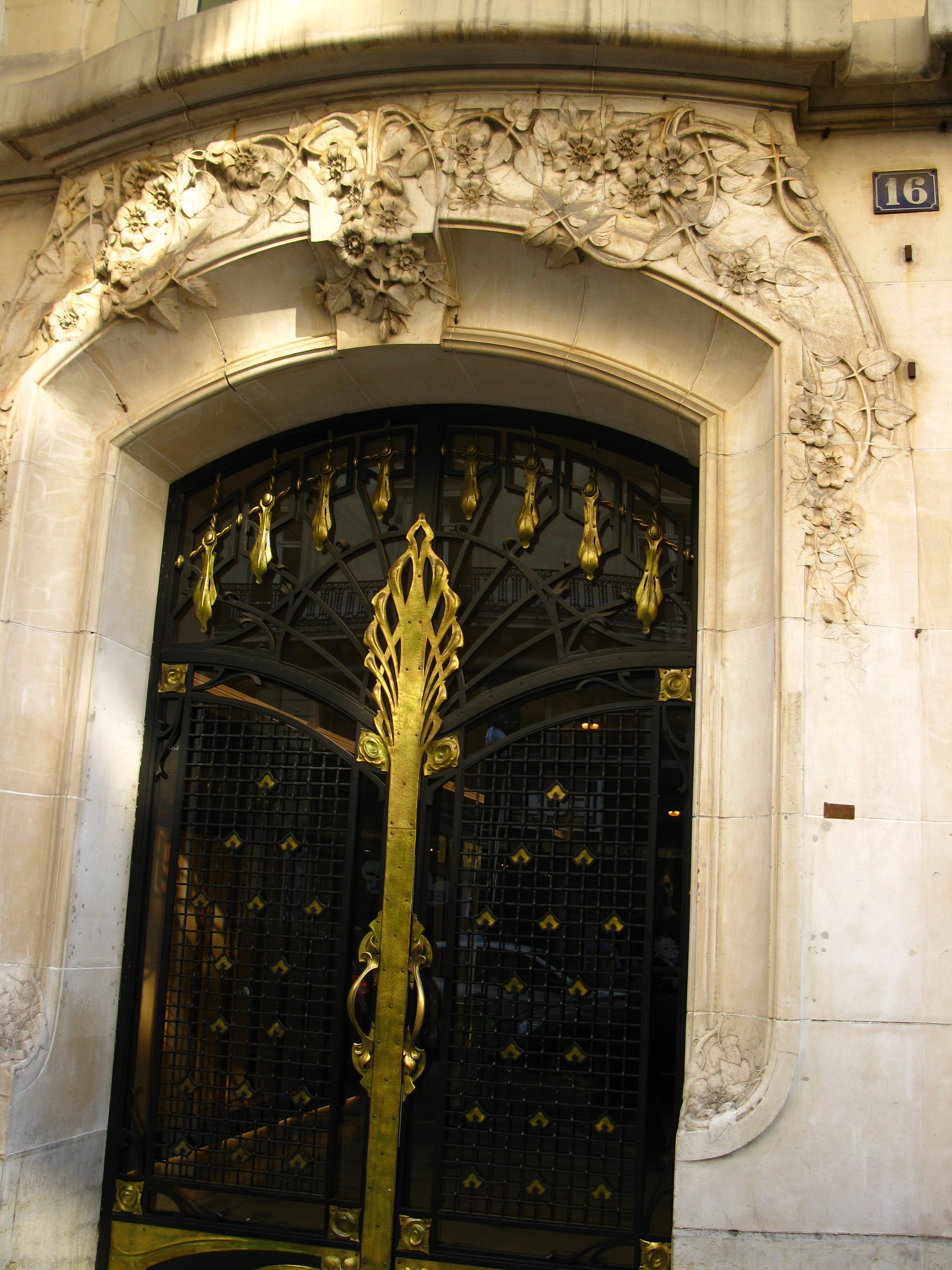
Entrance of La Semeuse de Paris, by Frantz Jourdain (1912)

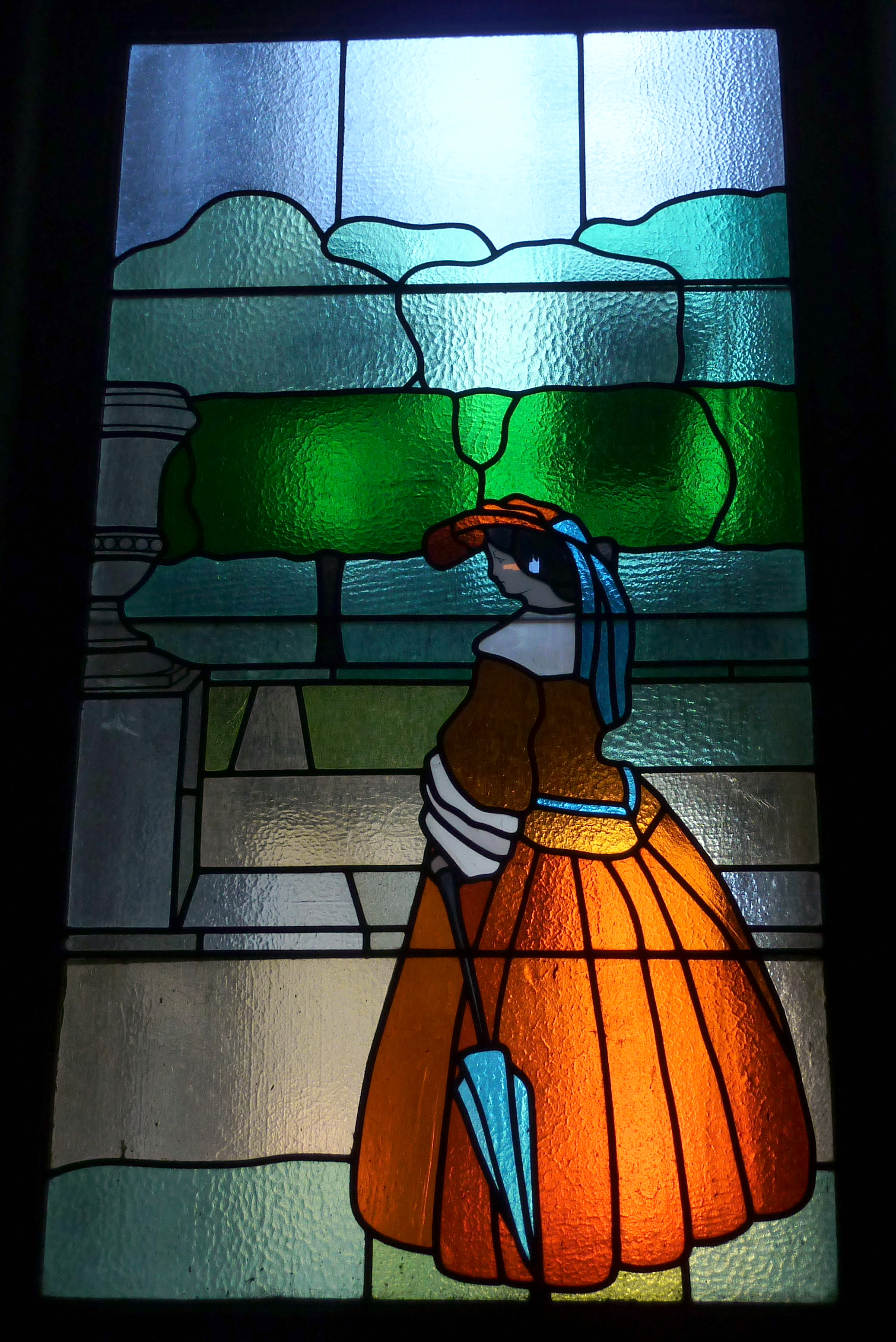
Window of La Semeuse de Paris by Francis Jourdain, son of the architect (1912)

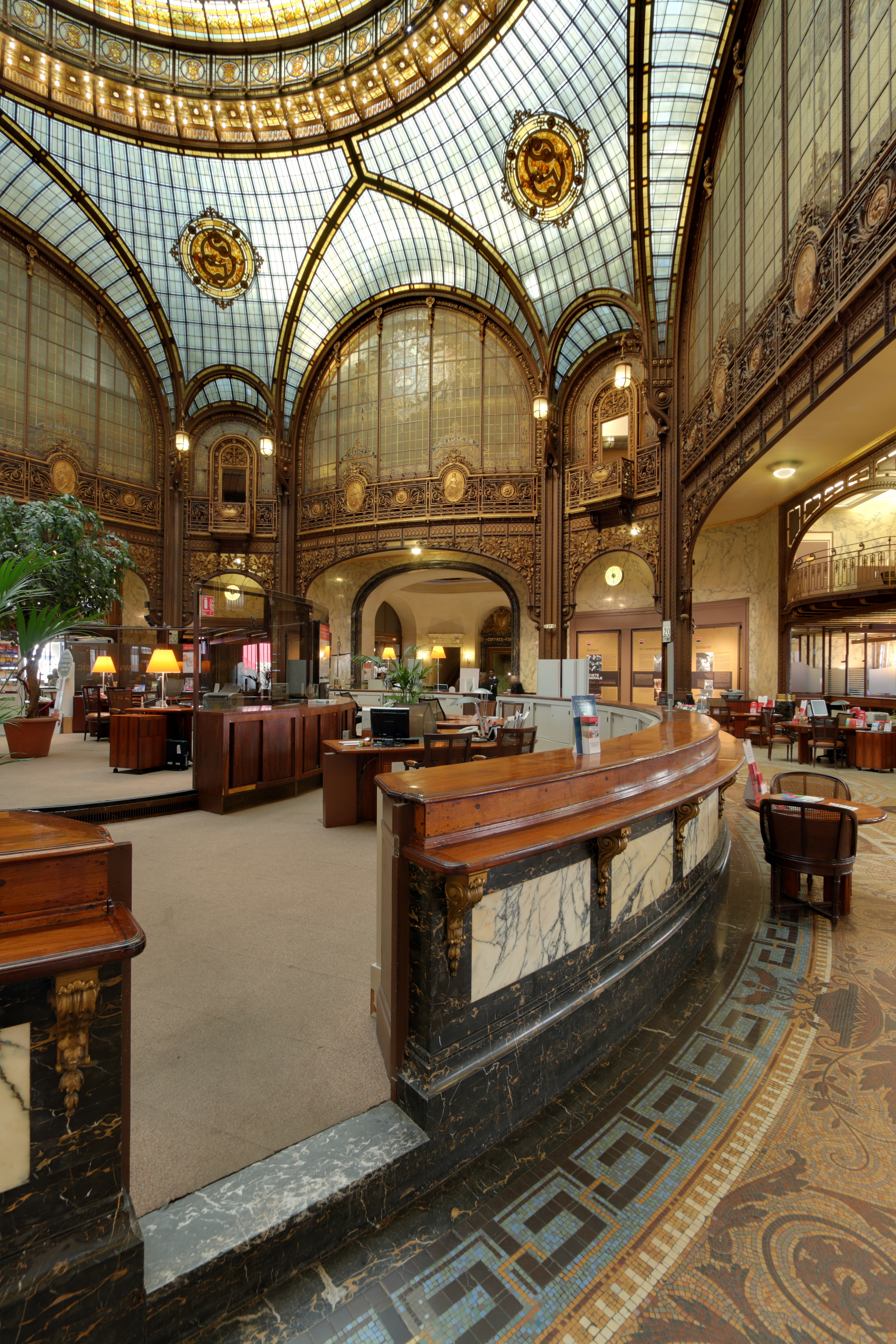
Cupola of the headquarters of Société Générale at 29 boulevard Haussmann, by Jacques Hermant (1905–1911)

=== Department stores and shops ===
The Paris department stores were early showcases of the Art Nouveau style, particularly in their interior galleries. Since gas lighting risked fires, and the reliable tungsten filament for electric light bulbs was not available before 1902, The buildings ere illuminated by large glass skylights over circular courtyards, ringed by galleries open to the courtyard. The most famous example is the Galeries Lafayette department store on Boulevard Haussmann, built by architect Georges Chedanne and his pupil Ferdinand Chanut. The building was begun in 1895, and the central dome and Art Nouveau staircases accessing it we're completed in 1912. Two later interior courtyards were destroyed in earlier remodeling, but the central courtyard, with its colorful glass cupola, has been restored, along with the Art Nouveau stairways.

The department store La Samaritaine at 13 rue de la Monnaie (1st arr.) on the right bank of the Seine, was designed Frantz Jourdain and opened in 1905. It had a stylized Art Nouveau exterior and glass-covered interior court. A second building in Art Deco style by Henri Sauvage was added in 1926. The original building was entirely remodeled in 2018, while preserving the Art Nouveau facades and some of the elements of the interior.

The style was also used in a number of smaller Paris shops, though few survive in their original form. One shop, the jewelry shop of designer Georges Fouquet, with an interior by graphic artist Alphonse Mucha, is now found in the Carnavalet Museum of the history of Paris.

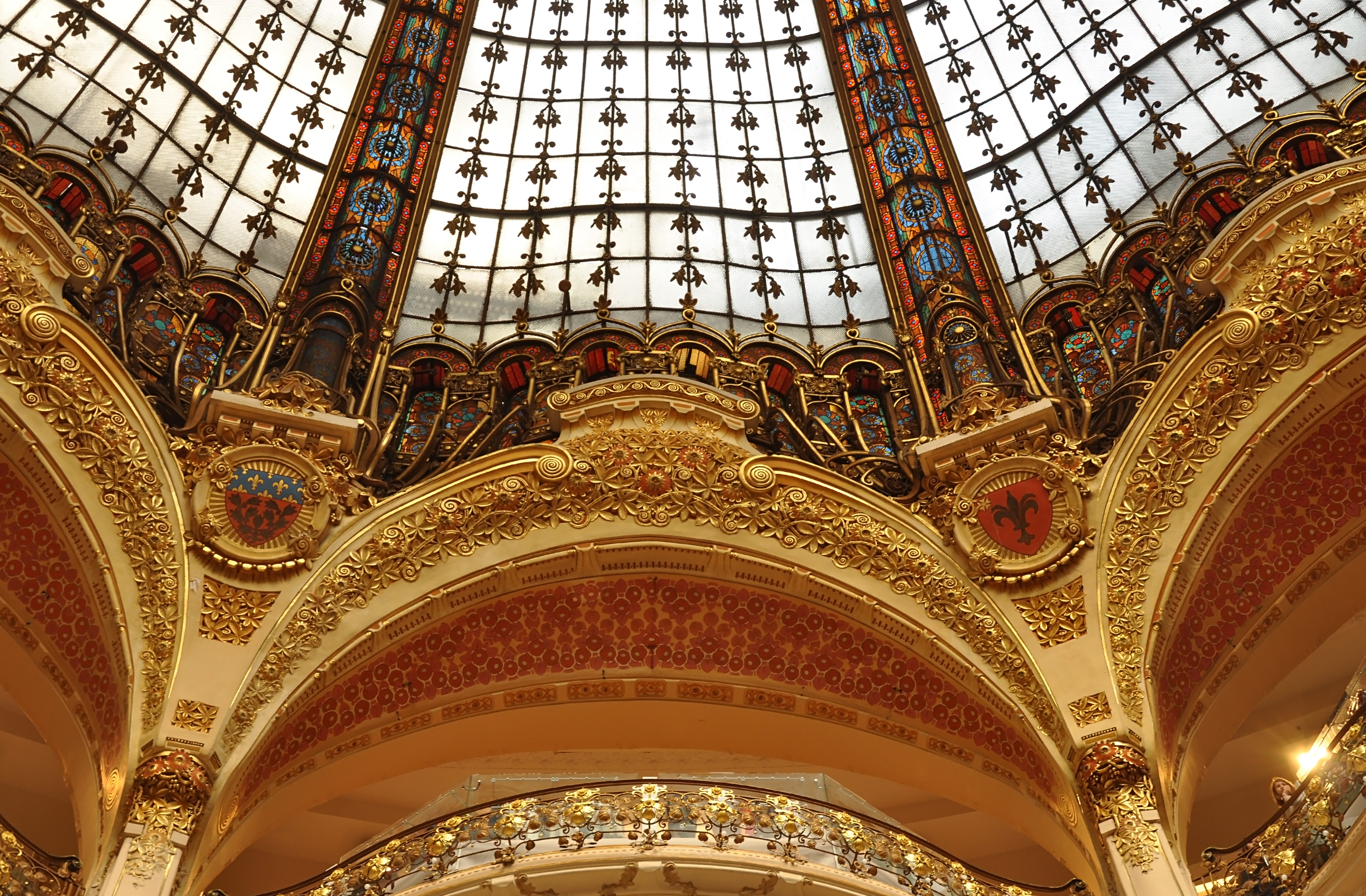
Detail of the cupola of Galeries Lafayette Department store (1912)

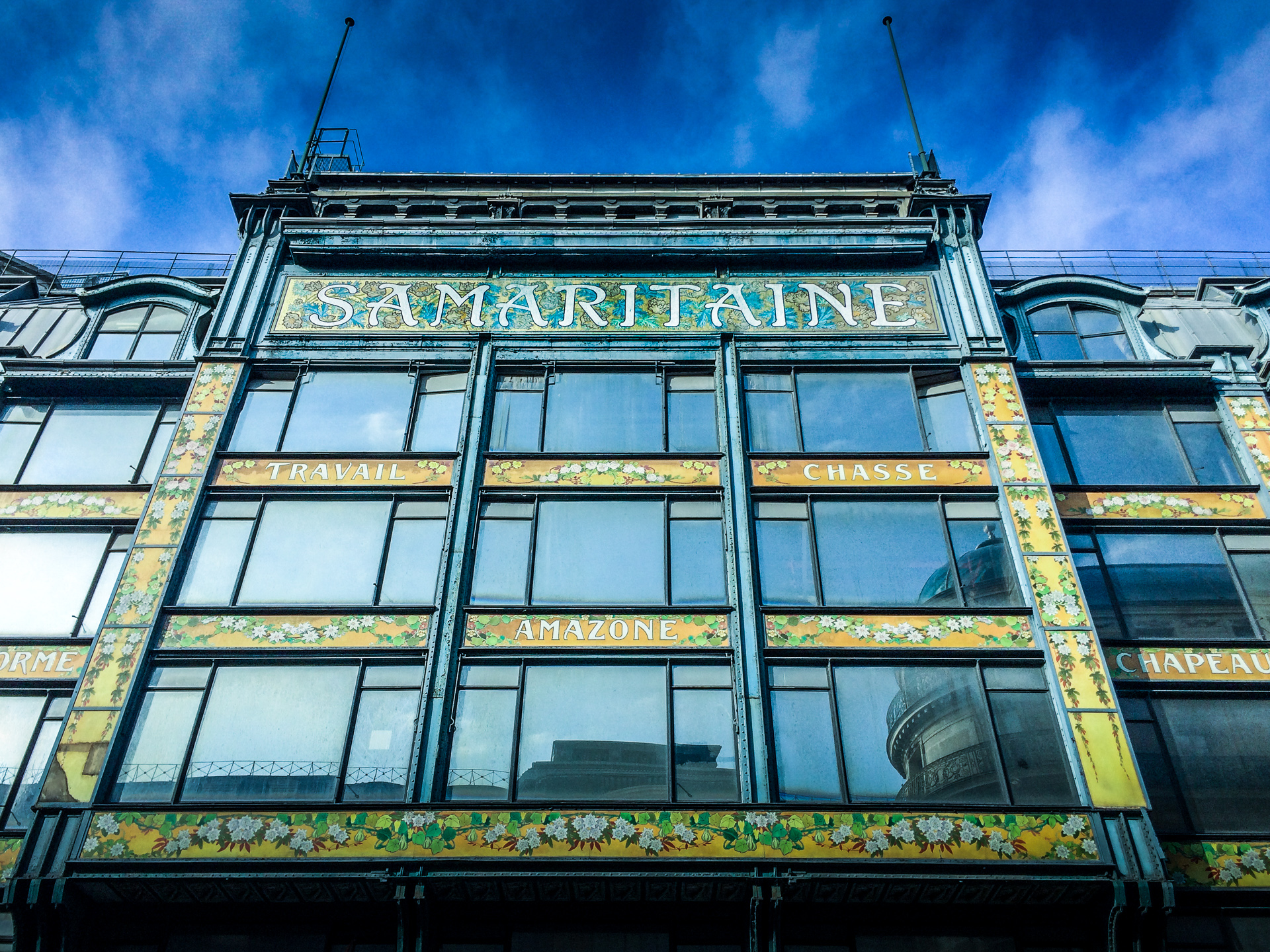
Art Nouveau facade of first La Samaritaine department store by Frantz Jourdain (1905).

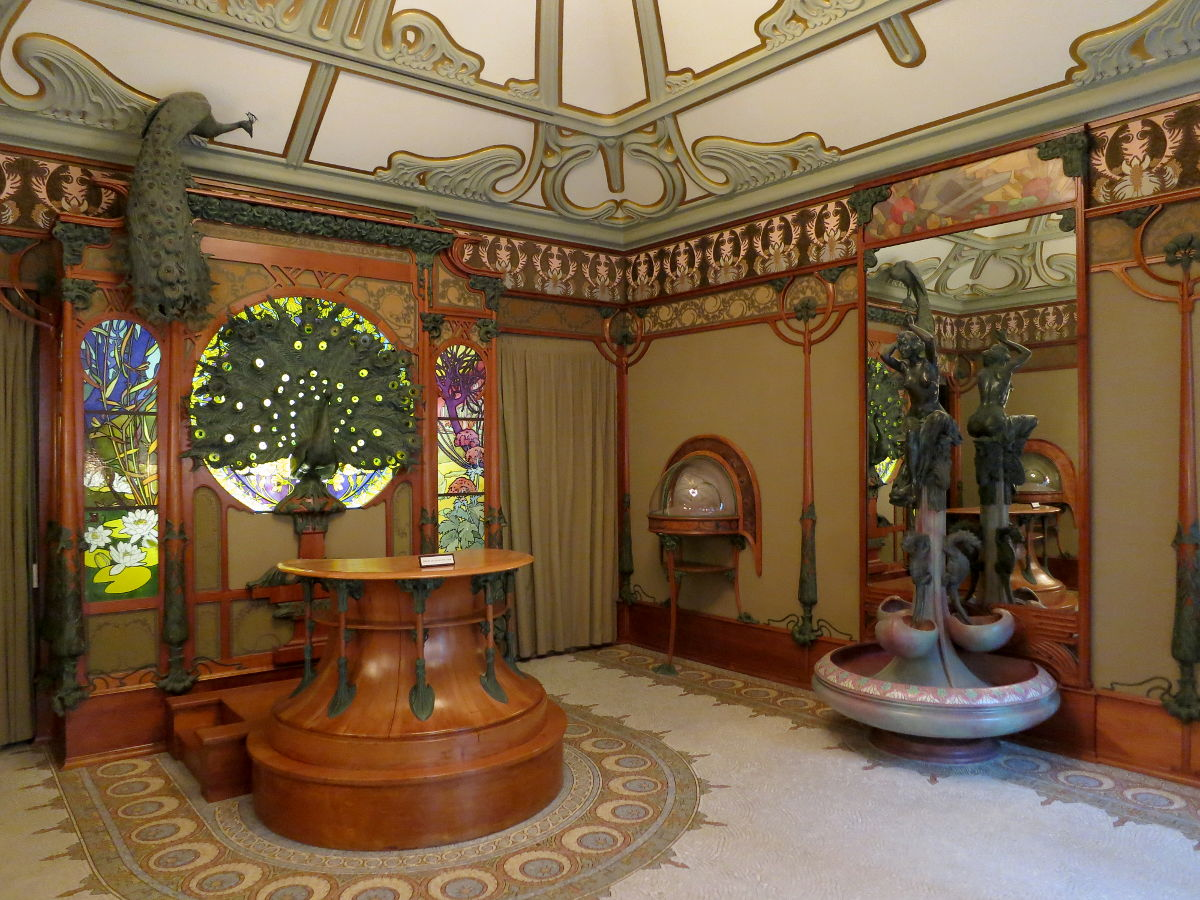
The jewellery shop of Georges Fouquet at 6 Rue Royale designed by Alphonse Mucha, now in the Carnavalet Museum (1901)

=== Churches ===
Several churches were built in Paris which incorporated Art Nouveau features, usually combined with other styles, including neo-Gothic. The most notable example of Art Nouveau-Gothic is the Église Saint-Jean-de-Montmartre (1894). The architect was Anatole de Baudot, a follower of Viollet-le-Duc, a professor of French architecture at the School of Chaillot, which trained experts in historical restoration, and professor of medieval architecture at the École des Beaux-Arts. Following the ideas of Viollet-le-Duc, he used modern materials, including an iron frame interior, combined with sculpture by Pierre Roche and ceramic tiles by Alexandre Bigot, who tiles were used in the facades of many Art Nouveau buildings. The open interior with its iron columns and arches was a strikingly modern.

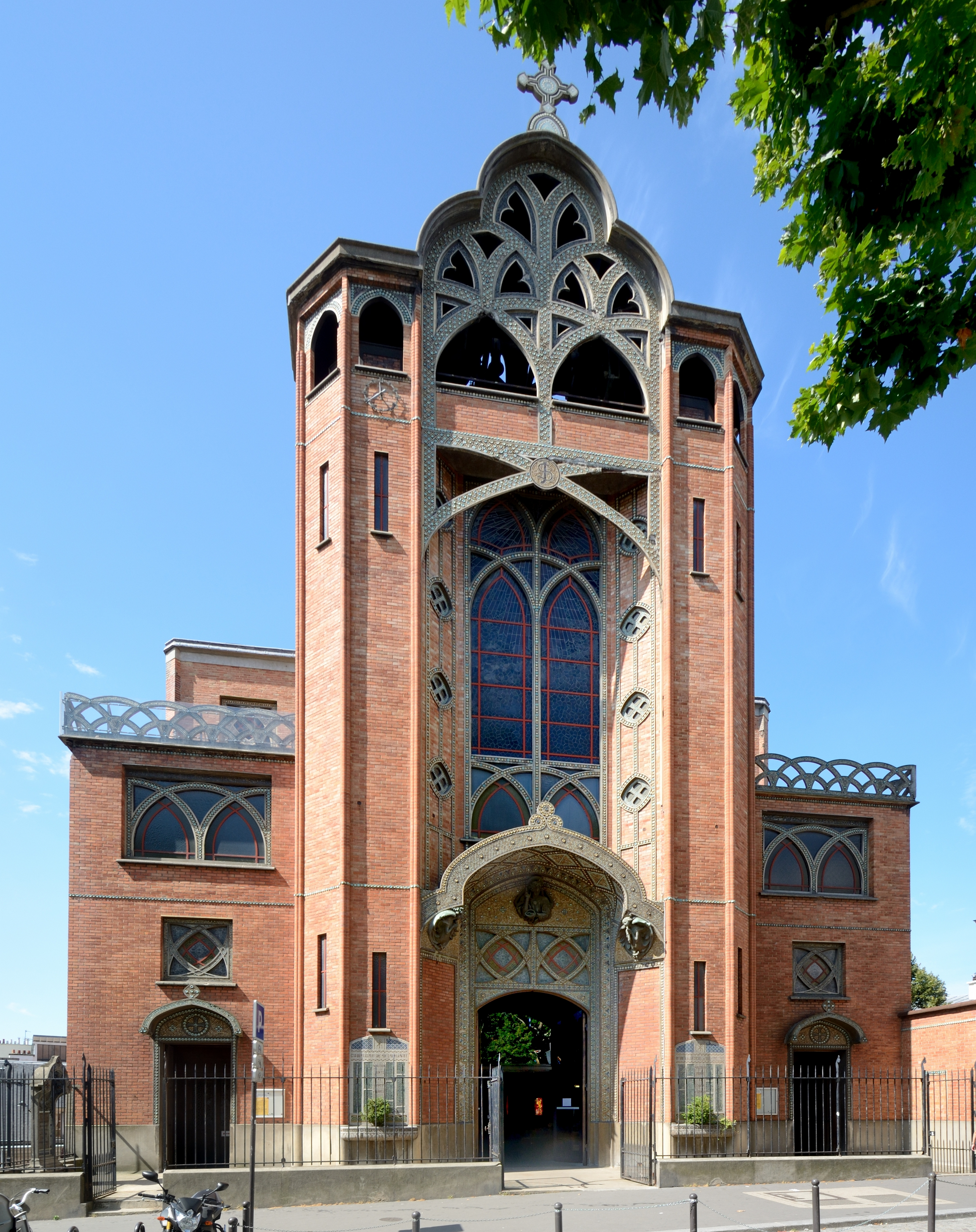
Église Saint-Jean-de-Montmartre (1894)

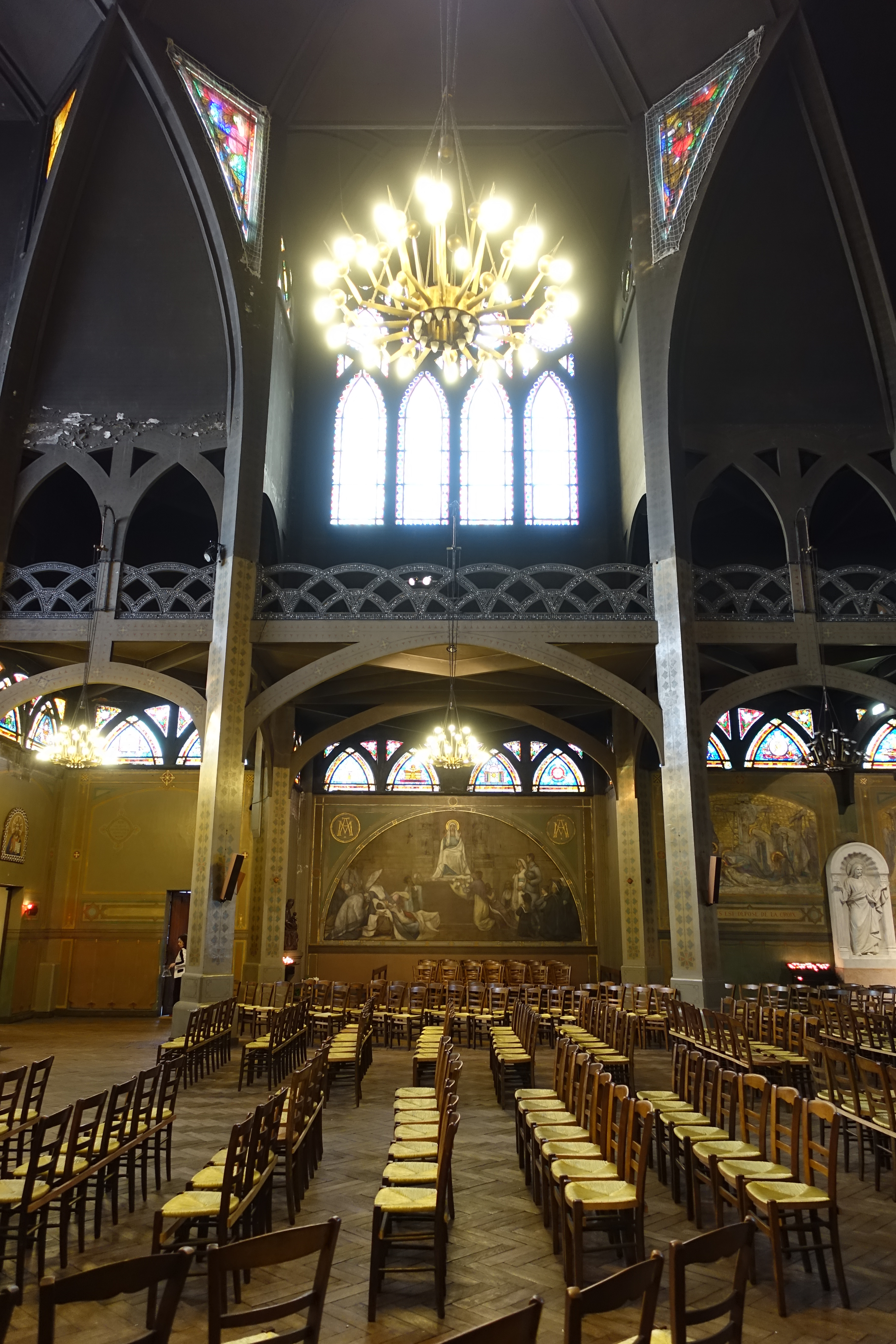
Interior of the Église Saint-Jean-de-Montmartre (1894)

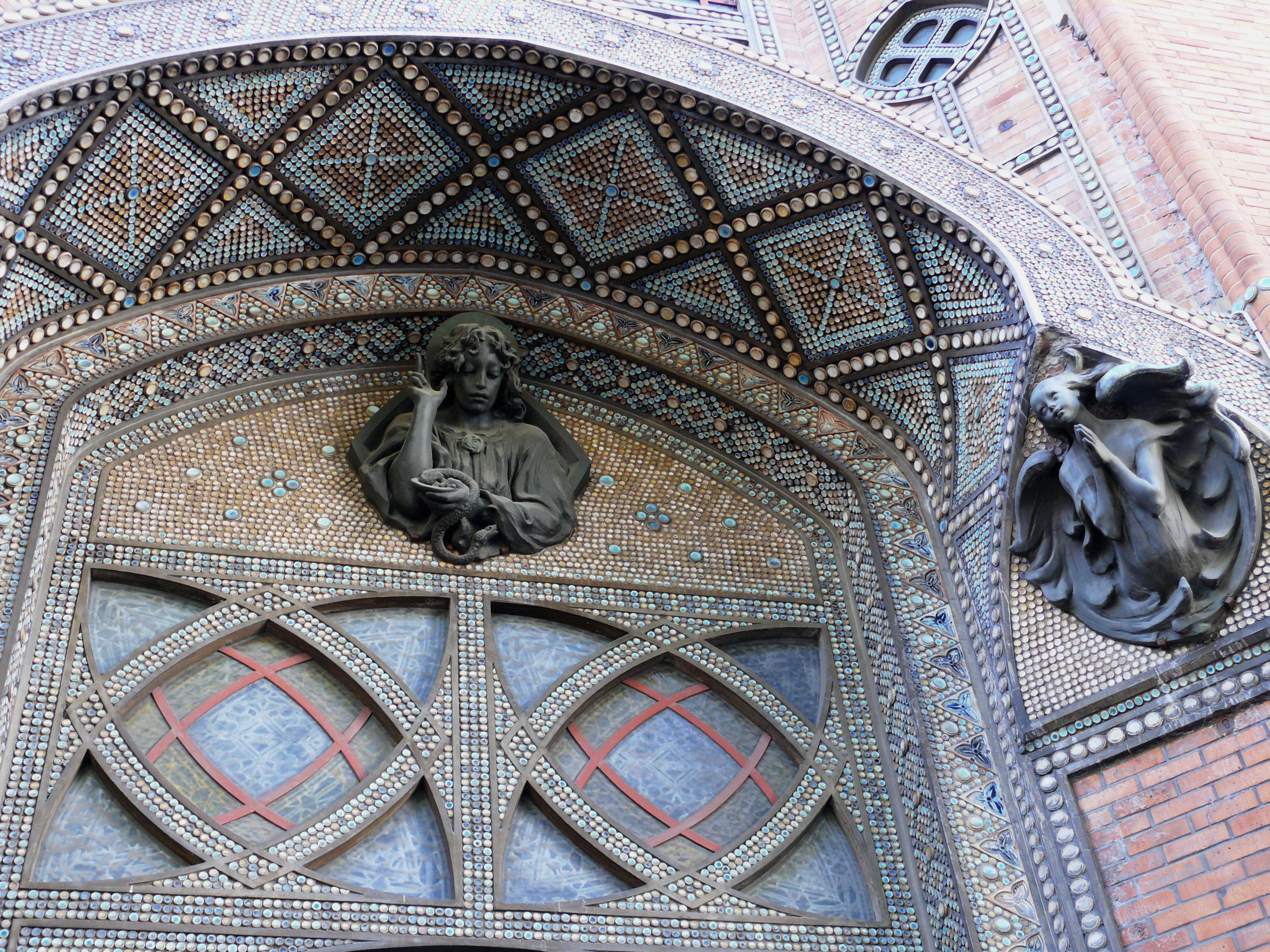
Detail of ceramic decoration and sculpture of the portal.

== Furniture – Hector Guimard and the Nancy School ==
Furniture was another important domain of the Art Nouveau. In some cases the architects themselves designed the furniture to match the exterior and interior decoration of the house, based on sinuous and curving lines and other forms based upon nature. This was the case of the Hôtel Guimard, the residence of Hector Guimard. The objective of both architects and furniture designers was to create a style which was different from the predominant neoclassical and Beaux-Arts styles which were dominant before Art Nouveau. Sometimes the Art Nouveau furniture and other decorative objects resembled the Rocaille or Rococo style of the reign of Louis XV, with its curving floral and vegetal designs, particularly in table legs, drawer handles and other ornament. The weakness of the Art Nouveau furniture style was that, since the furniture matched the decoration and architecture of the room, the furniture could not be changed or added to without disrupting the harmony of the room. This was one reason why the popularity of Art Nouveau decoration was short-lived.

Louis Majorelle was another major figure in Art Nouveau furniture design. His house and workshops were in Nancy in Lorraine, but he also had a large residence and showroom in Paris, and he was a leading participant in all of the major expositions and salons of the period. Majorelle's furniture pieces were hand-made individually, rarely in a series, and used expensive and exotic materials. The Cabinet by Louis Majorelle illustrated in the gallery below, from about 1900–1910, (now in the Dallas Museum of Art) is crafted of mahogany, oak and walnut, with inlays of exotic hardwoods. combined with handles and other decoration of bronze.

Eugène Vallin was another important figure in Art Nouveau furniture. Like Majorelle, his workshop was in Nancy, and he and Majorelle were founders of the École de Nancy, a group of artisans who created the distinctive Nancy style of art Nouveau, which became popular in Paris. In the second part of the Art Nouveau period, from 1900 until 1914, Majorelle and most of the members of the Nancy School modified the Art Nouveau style, making it less ornate, with cleaner lines and simpler forms,

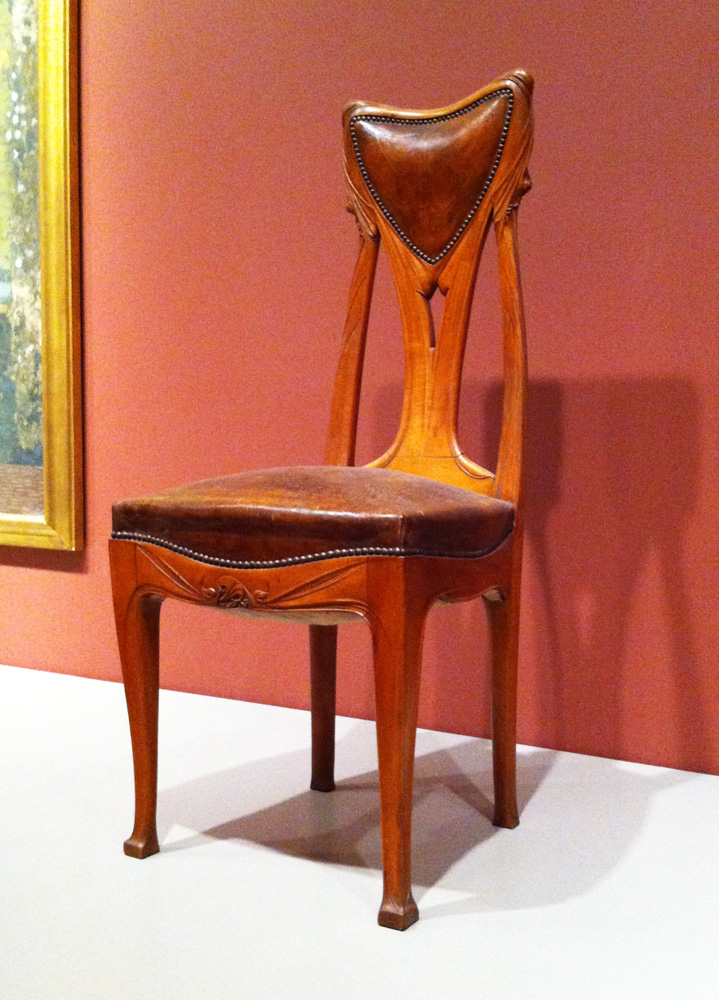
Side chair by Hector Guimard (1900) (Art Institute of Chicago)

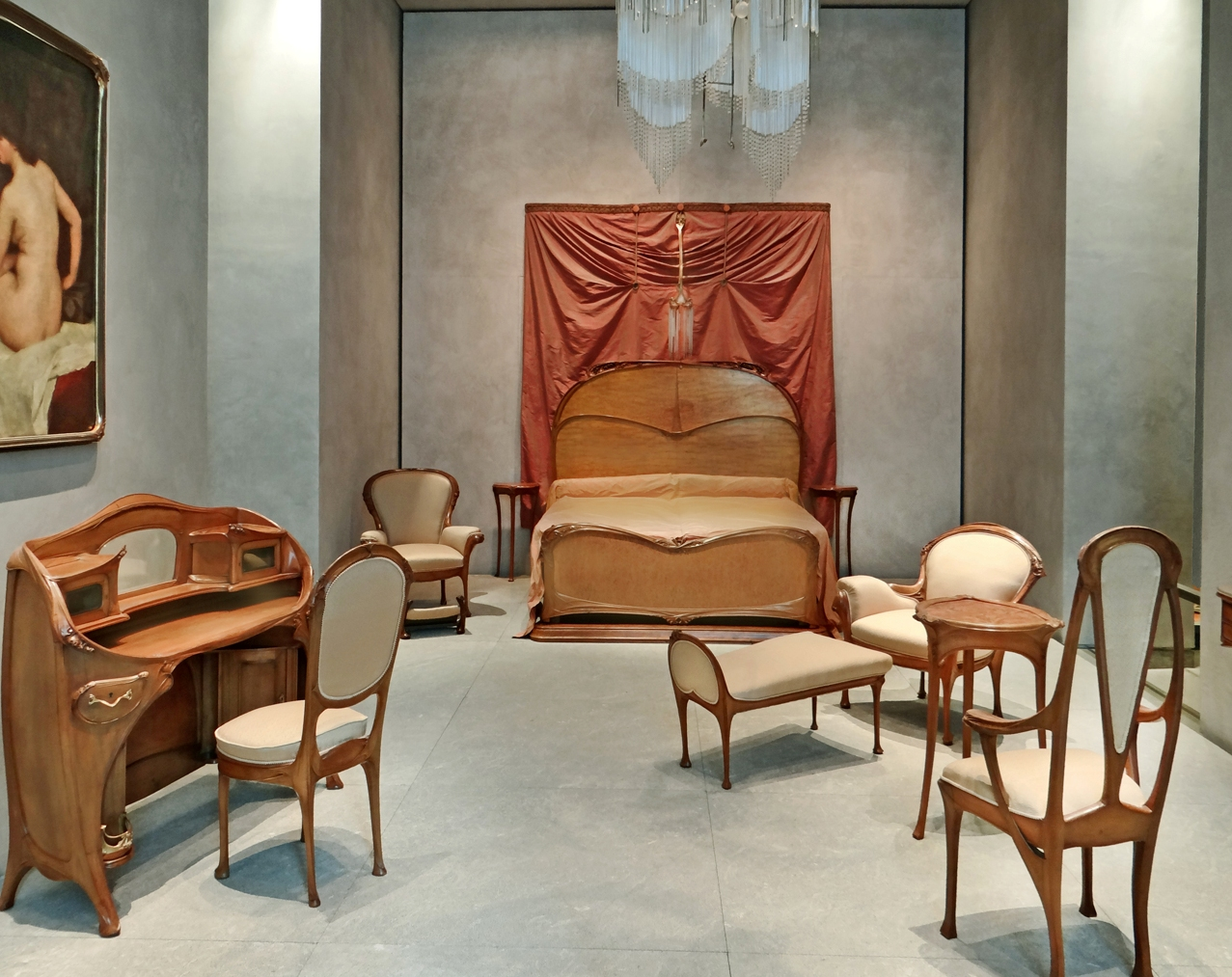
Bedroom furniture of the Hôtel Guimard by Hector Guimard (now in the Musée des Beaux-Arts de Lyon)

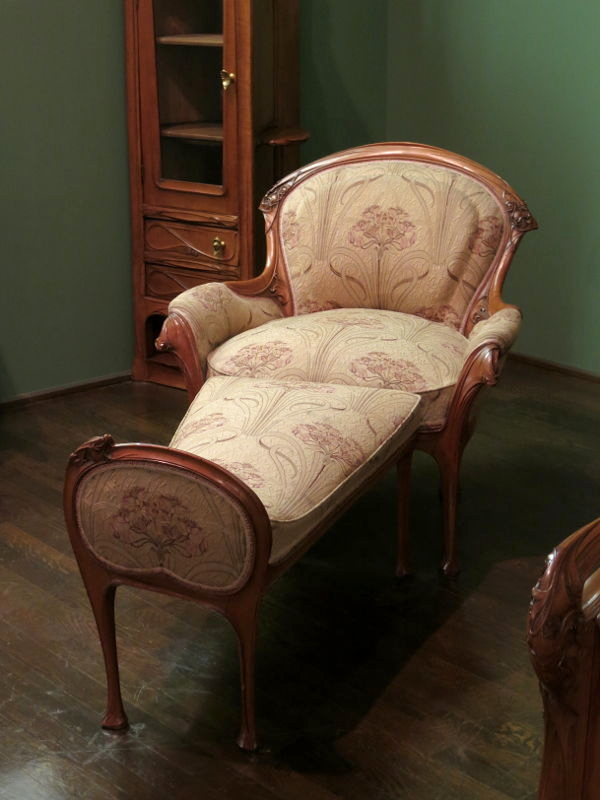
Chaise Lonngue by Hector Guimard in the Musée des Arts Décoratifs, Paris (c. 1903)

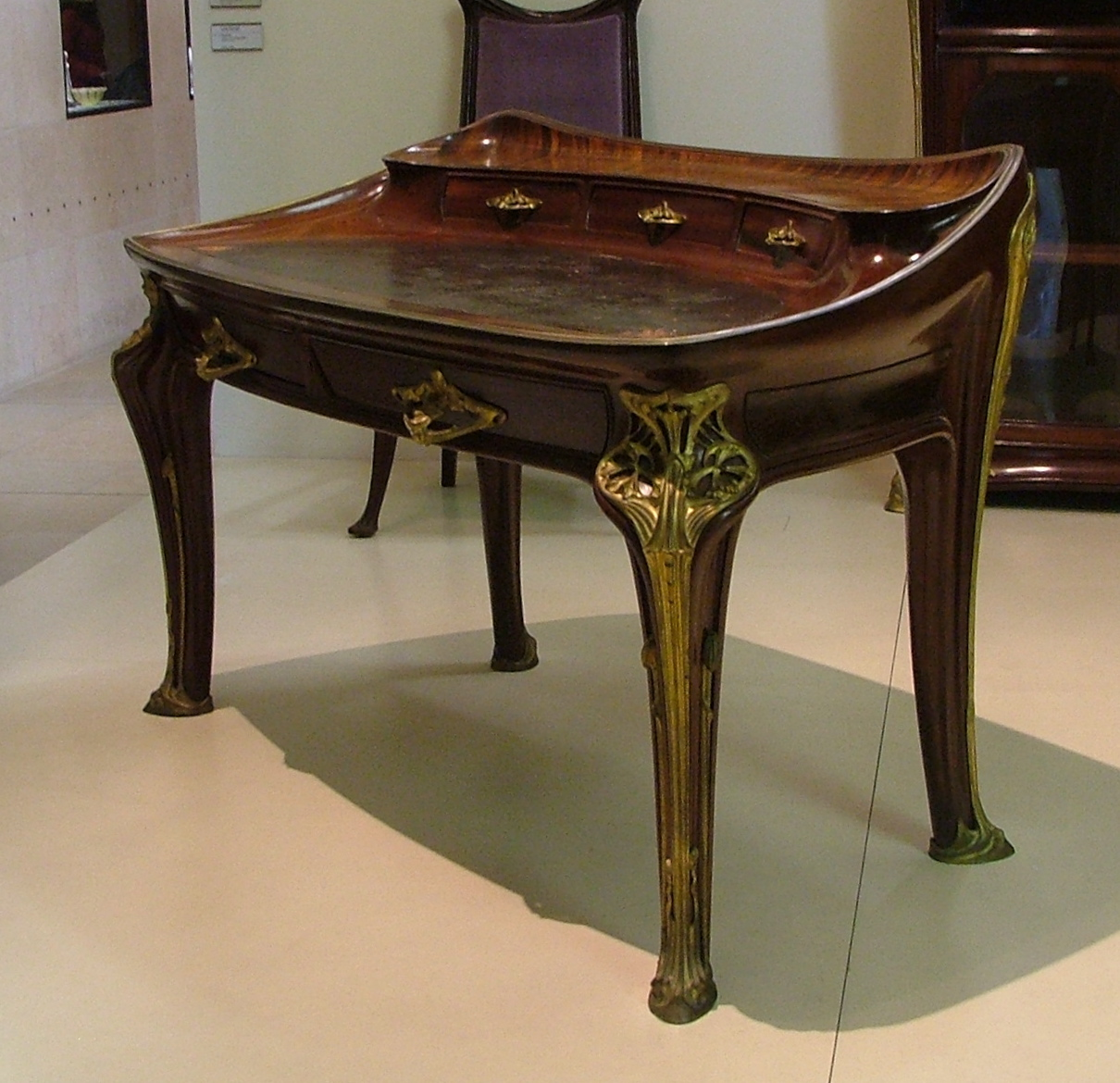
Desk by Louis Majorelle (1903–04), at the Musée d'Orsay, Paris.

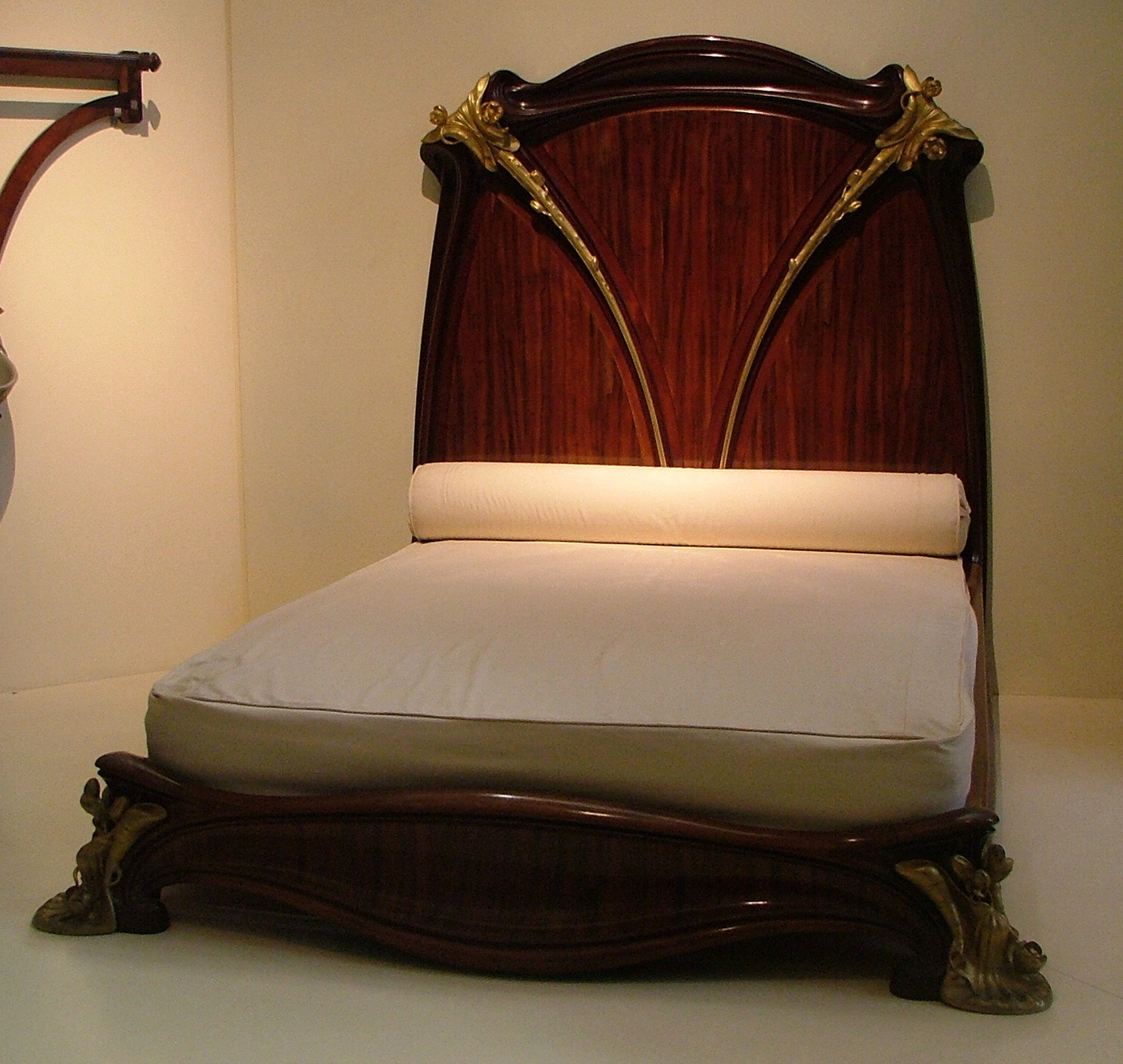
The "Water Lily" bed by Louis Majorelle (1902–1903), Musée d'Orsay, Paris.

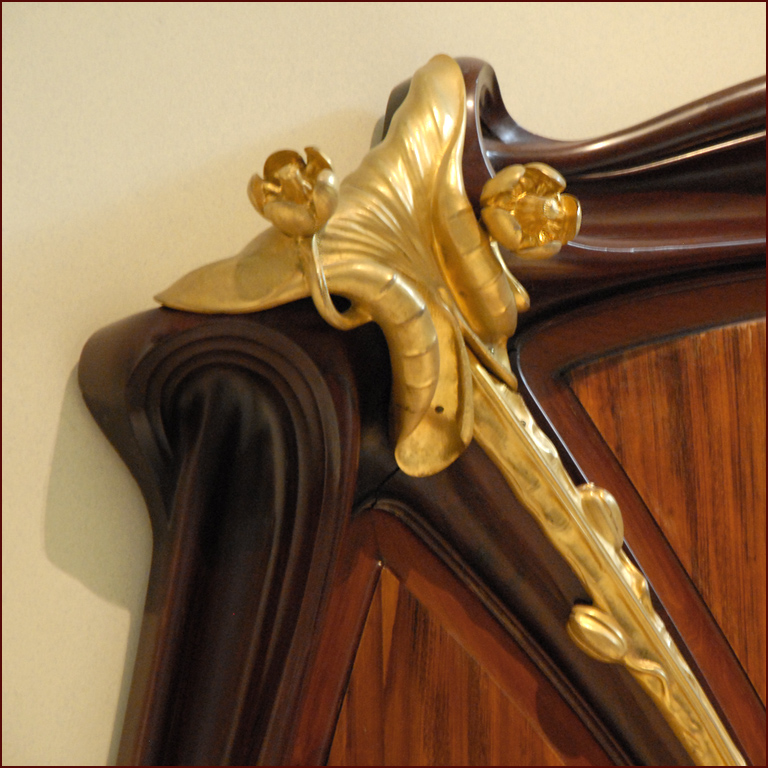
Detail of the "Water Lily" bed by Louis Majorelle

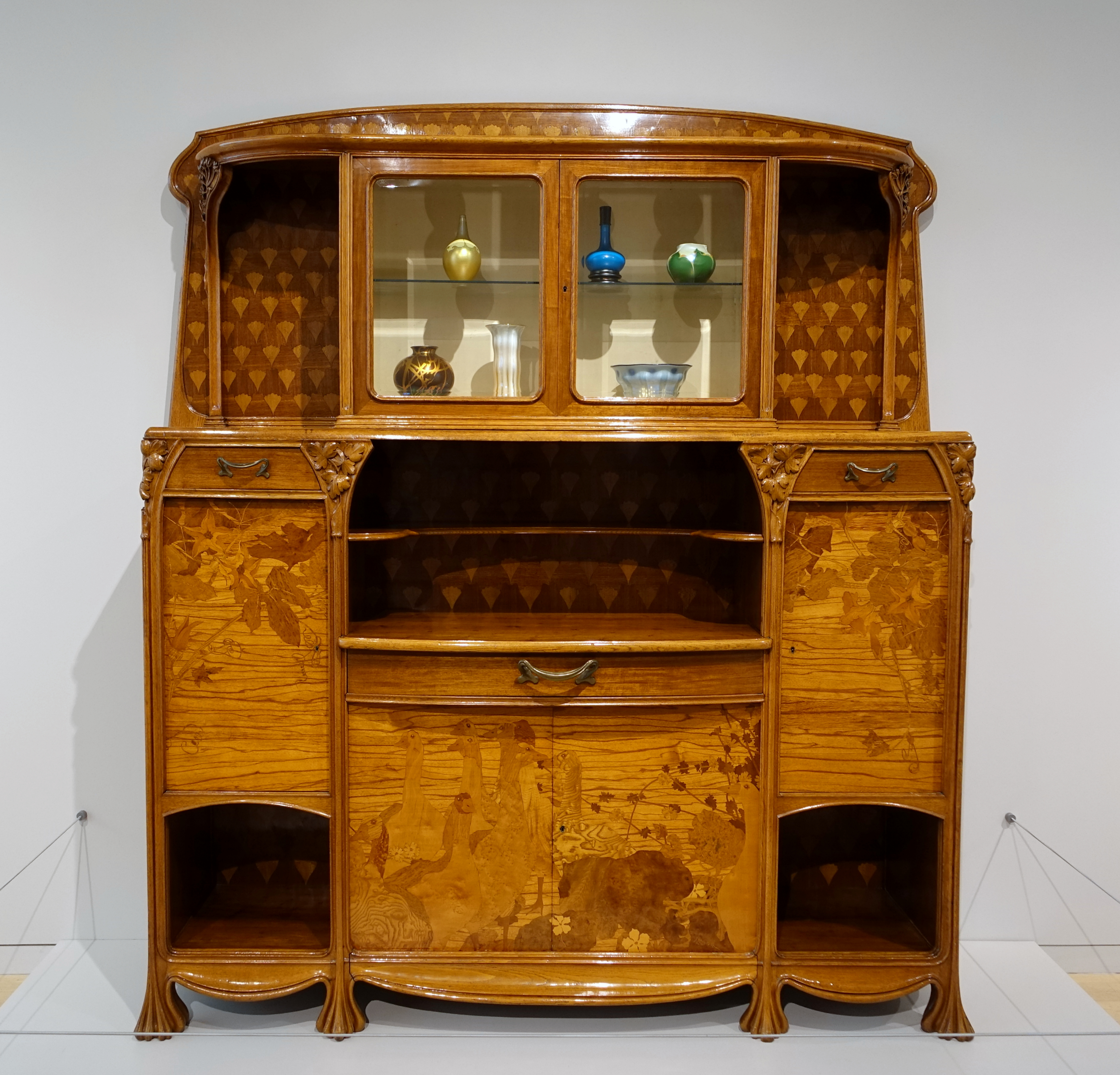
Cabinet by Louis Majorelle, with glass vases by Louis Comfort Tiffany (1900–1910), (Dallas Museum of Art)

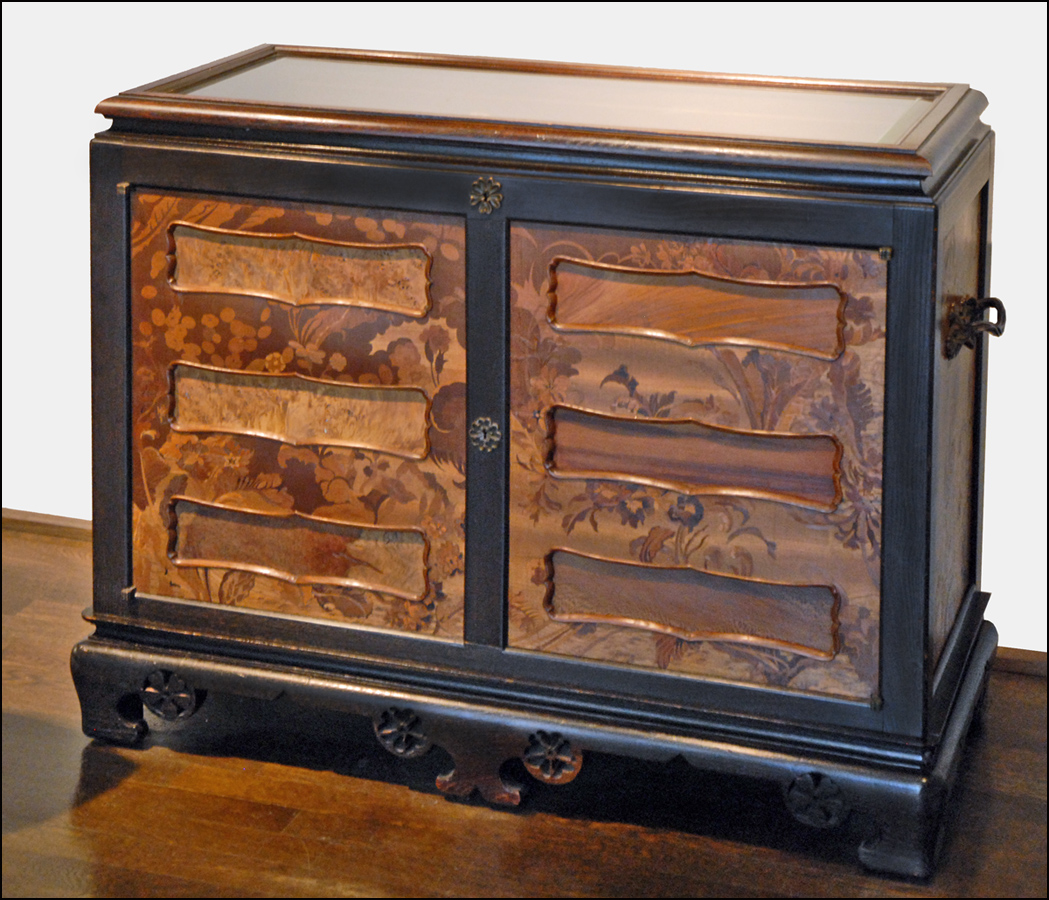
cabinet of ash wood, oak and poplar, with marquetry of colored woods and sculpted bronze, by Émile Gallé presented at the 1900 Paris Exposition (1900), (Musée des Arts Décoratifs, Paris)

== Glassware ==
Much of the Art Nouveau glassware in Paris came from the city of Nancy, in Lorraine, in eastern France. That city was the home of the workshops of Émile Gallé and of the Daum Studio, and had a large number of skilled craftsmen. Daum specialized in lead glass or crystal, which it made by a traditional Glass casting process. Art Nouveau glassware preceded Art Nouveau in other media; floral vases and cups by the Daum Studio were displayed as early as the 1889 Paris Exposition. The glassware from Nancy was one of the major features at the 1900 Paris Exposition. It predominantly featured the same motifs as the furniture and other media; flowing lines and floral designs, with rich colors. The Daum process often involved modeling the glass while it was hot, and adding polychrome powdered enamels which vitrified on the surface. The handle was molded and added while it was hot.

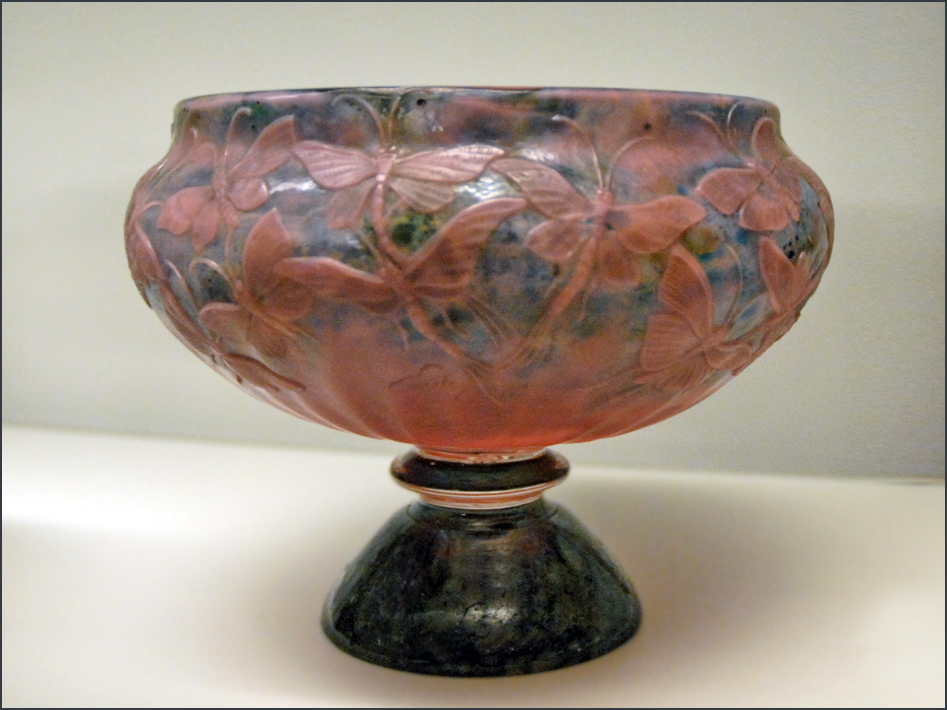
Cup from the Daum Studio (1889), Musée des Arts Décoratifs, Paris

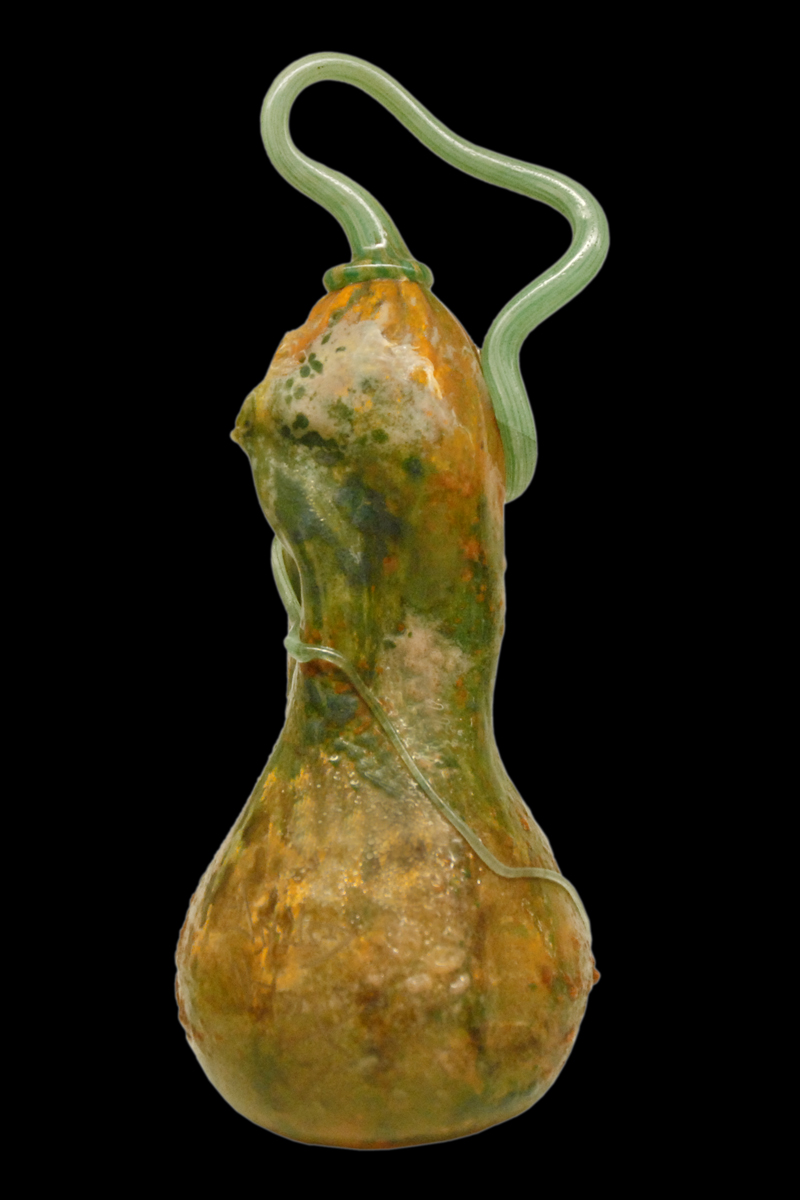
Crystal vase from Daum Studio made of blown glass with polychrome enamels added while it was hot. (1910)

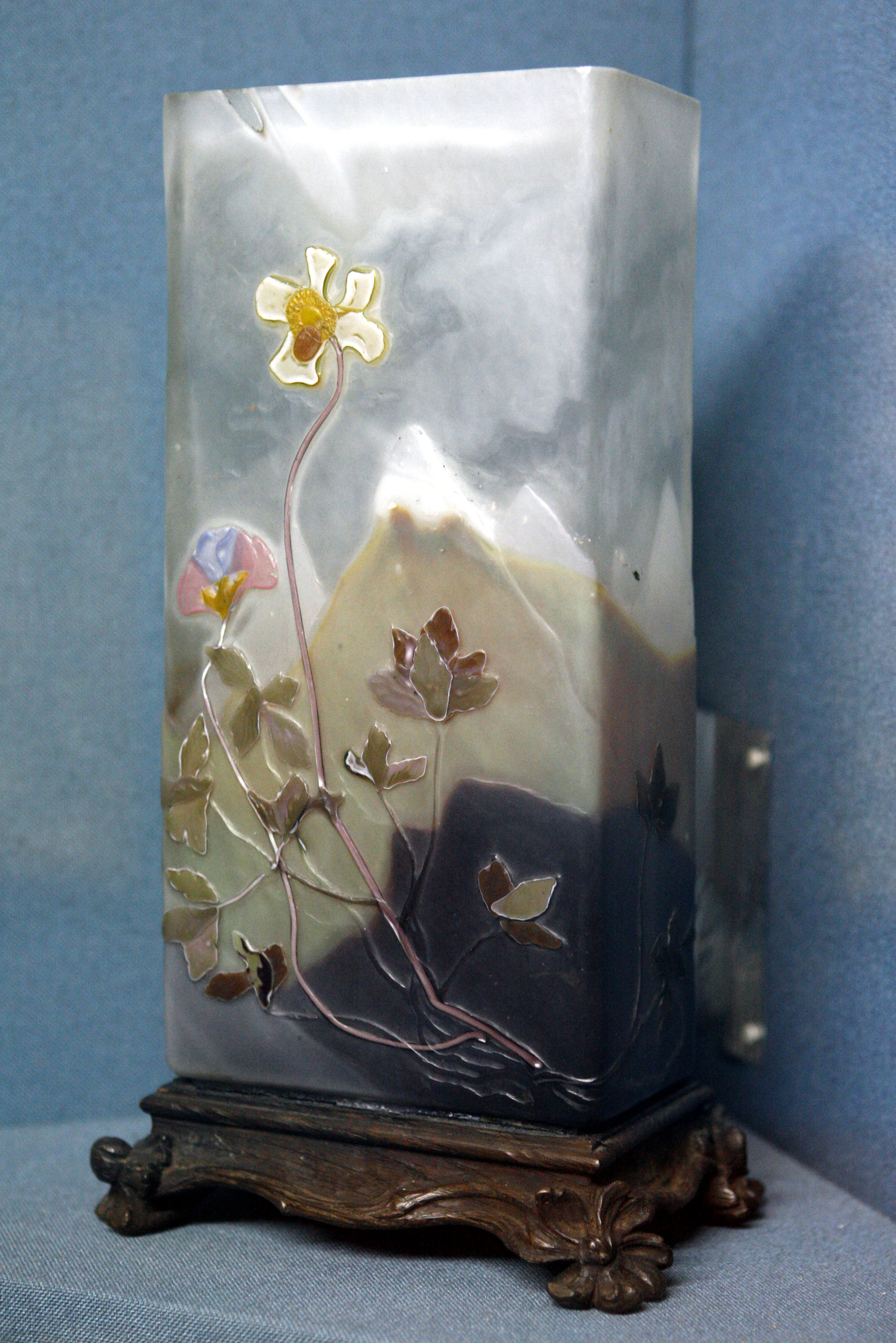
Engraved crystal vase by Gallé, circa 1900

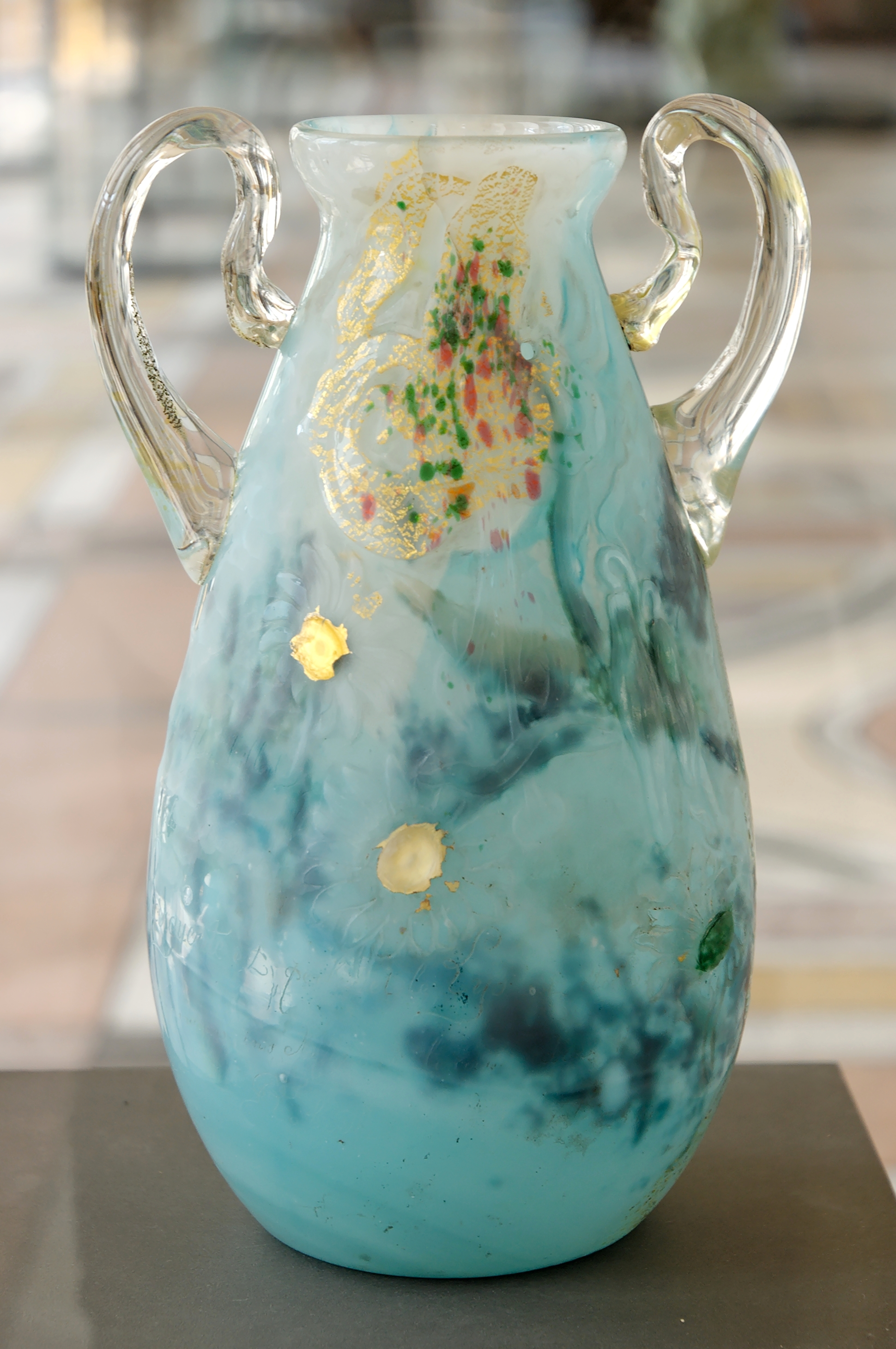
Gallé vase with lilies and daises

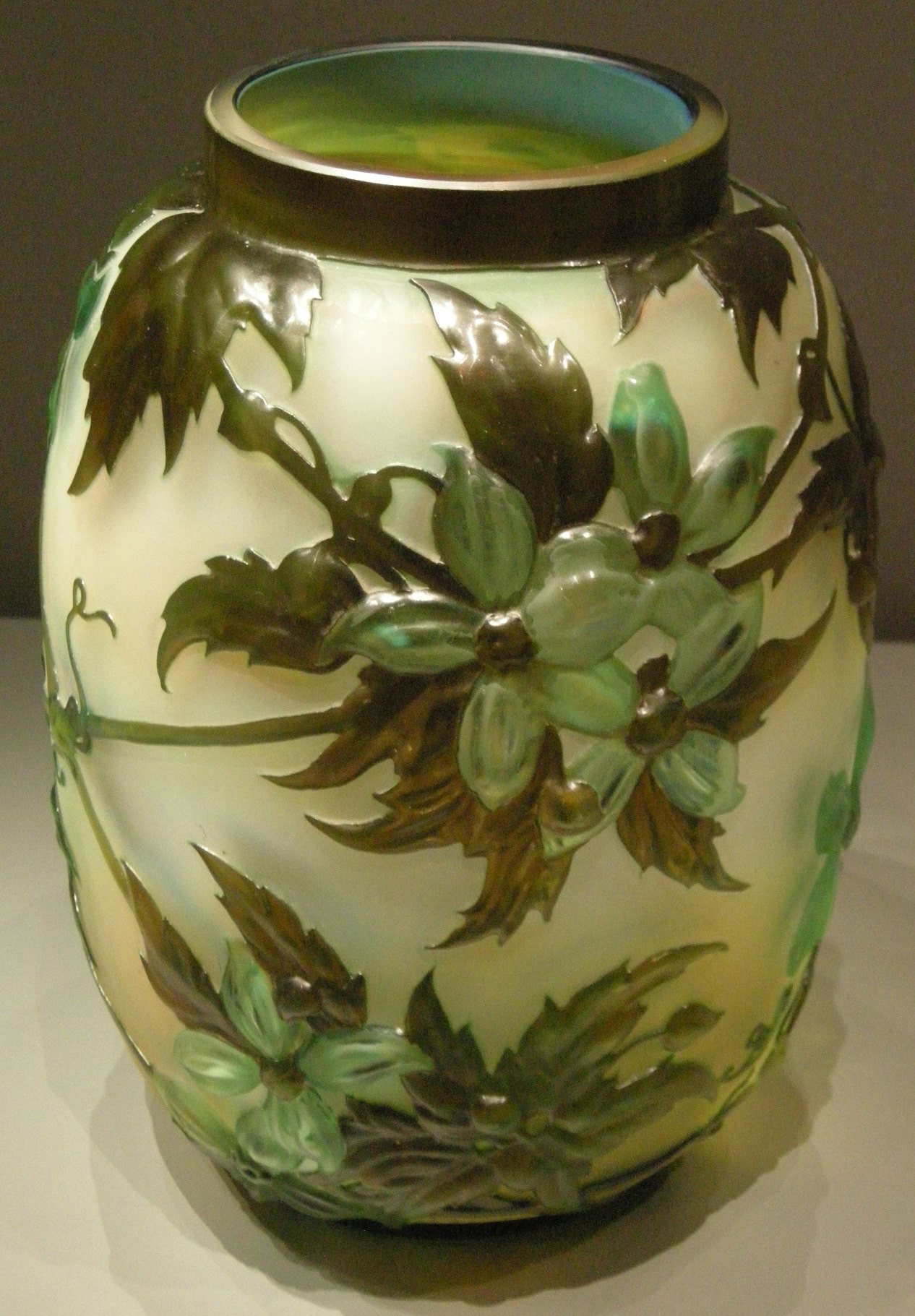
Cameo glass vase by Gallé

== Ceramic art ==
Ceramic sculpture and objects were an important component of Paris Art Nouveau. Ceramic tiles and decoration were featured on the facades of buildings, and appeared as works of sculpture. A major ceramics workshop had been founded in Paris by the Alsacian Théodore Deck in the 1870s. He began to create works based on floral patterns and Japanese designs and techniques. Technical developments advanced under his pupil, Edmond Lachenal, who used bright polychrome glazes. Other important figures in ceramic arts included Auguste Delaherche, Clément Massier, and Jean Carriès.

The ceramics manufacturer Alexandre Bigot was a major figure in Paris ceramics. His pavilion at the Exposition Universelle (1900) was entirely covered in ceramic sculpture on classical and Art Nouveau themes, including bicycles. The Pavilion was demolished at the end of the Exposition, but many of the decorations were preserved. His ceramics also lavishly covered the facades of the Paris houses designed by Jules Lavirotte.

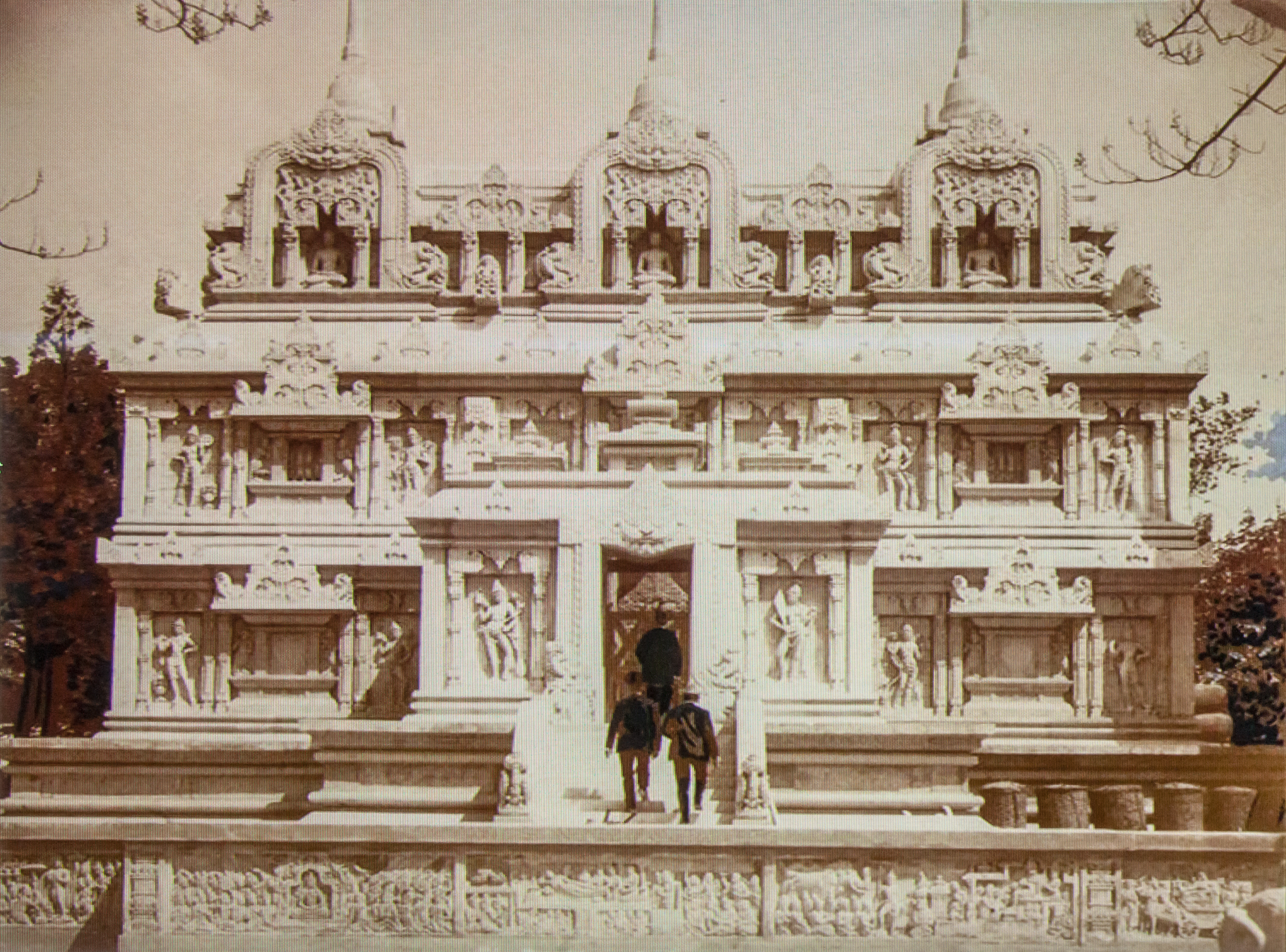
Bigot Pavilion at the Exposition Universelle (1900) in Paris

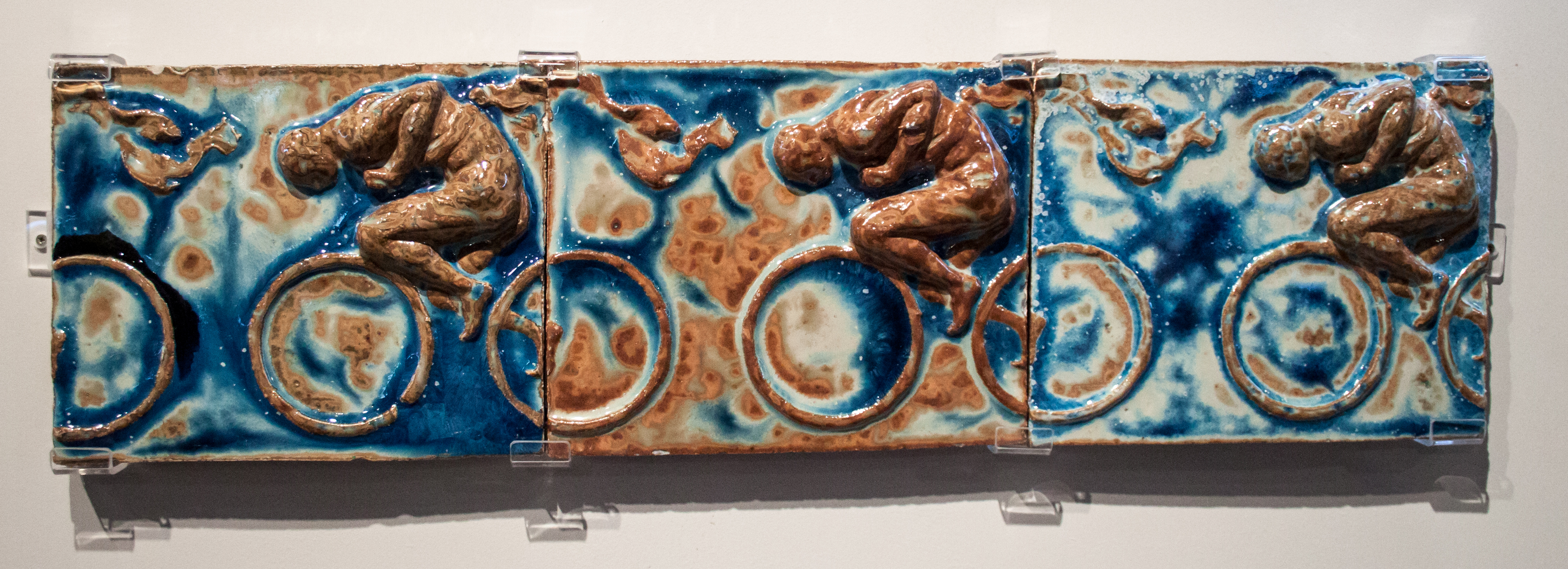
Ceramic tiles from the Bigot Pavilion at the Exposition Universelle (1900)

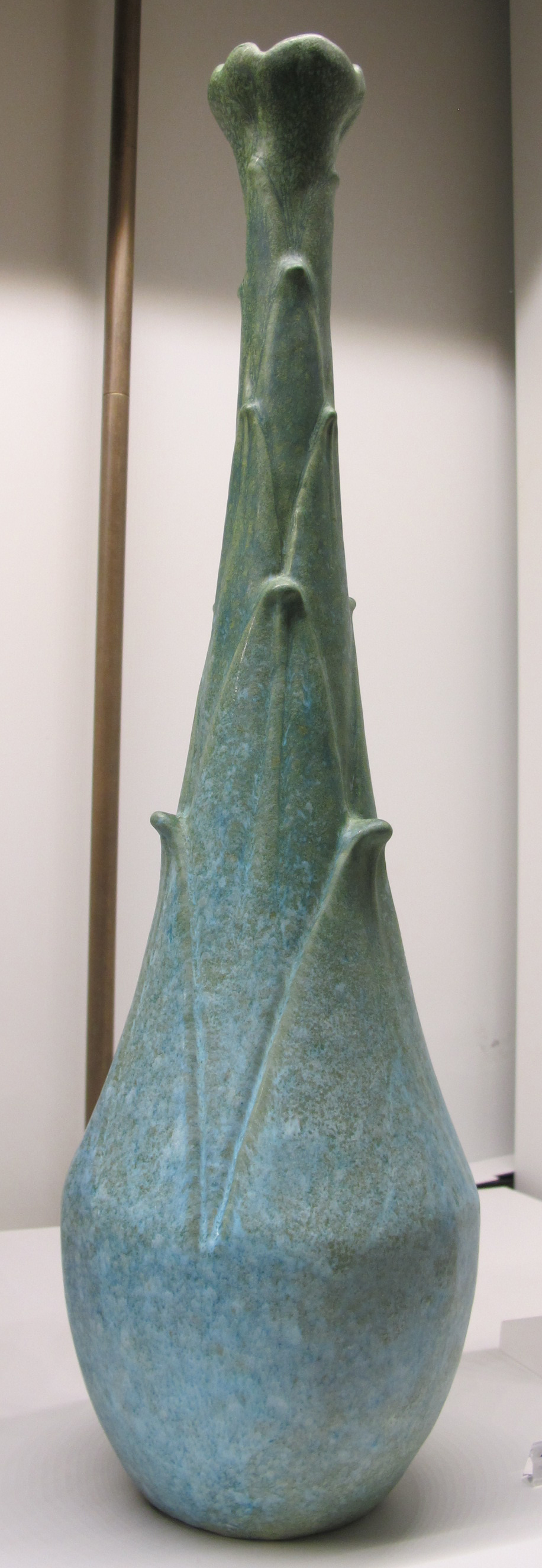
Ceramic vase by Edmond Lachenal (1902)

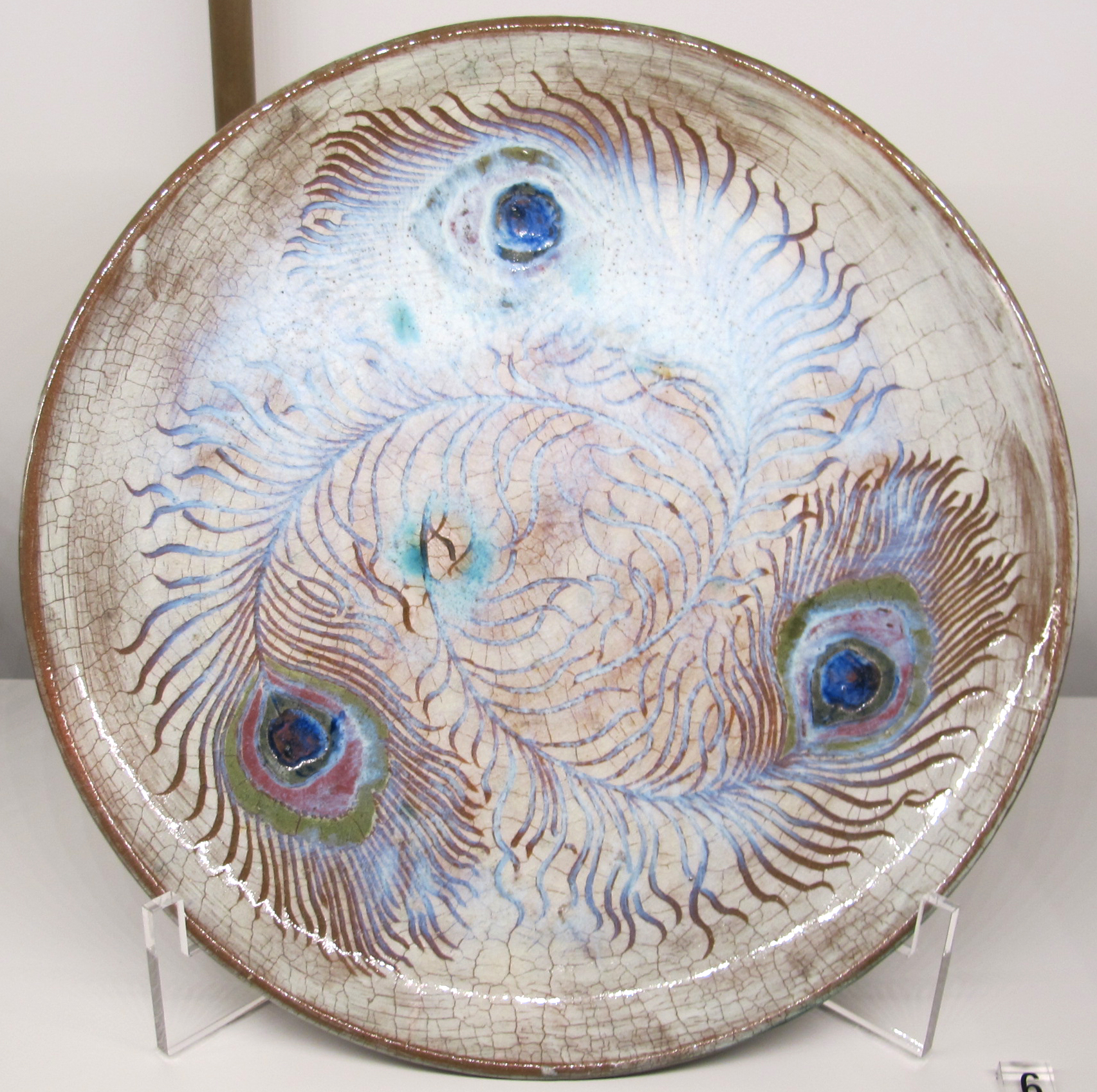
Peacock plate by Auguste Delaherche (1887–94)

== Metalwork and sculpture ==
Decorative ironwork and metal sculpture were important elements of Art Nouveau, used in the decoration of facades, in small statues and in the handles and other ornament on furniture. One of the most versatile artists was the painter and bronze sculptor Georges de Feure. Born in Belgium, he moved to Paris, and became a lead designer for Art Nouveau gallery owner Siegfried Bing. Besides metal work, He designed furniture, wrote for newspapers, and created stage sets and posters for the Le Chat Noir cabaret. His work was featured at the Exposition Universelle de Paris, and in 1901 he was named a Chevalier de la Légion d'honneur for his contribution to the decorative arts. Examples of his work can be found at the Musée des Arts Décoratifs in Paris.

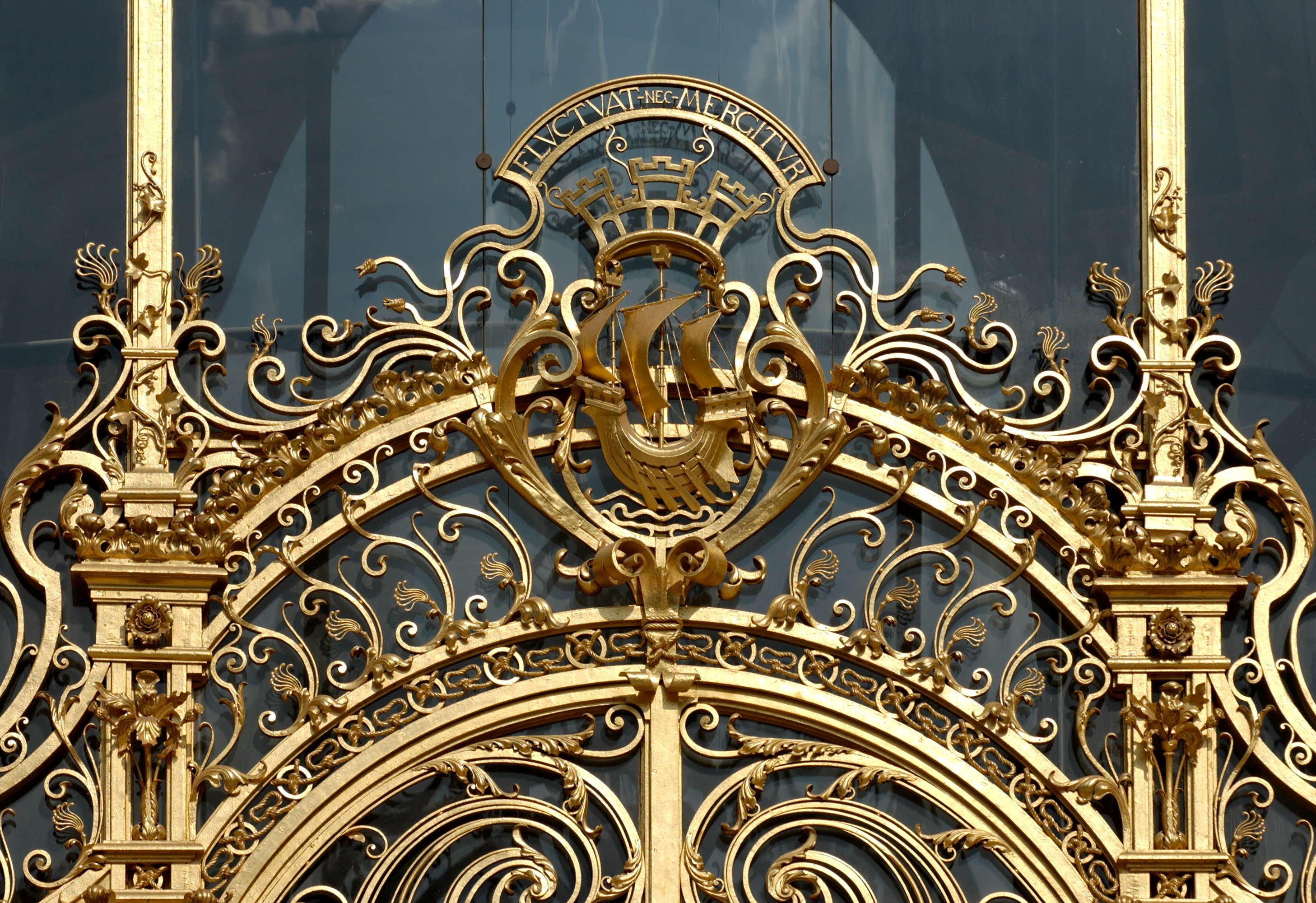
Ironwork gate of the Petit Palais, Paris by Charles Girault (1900)

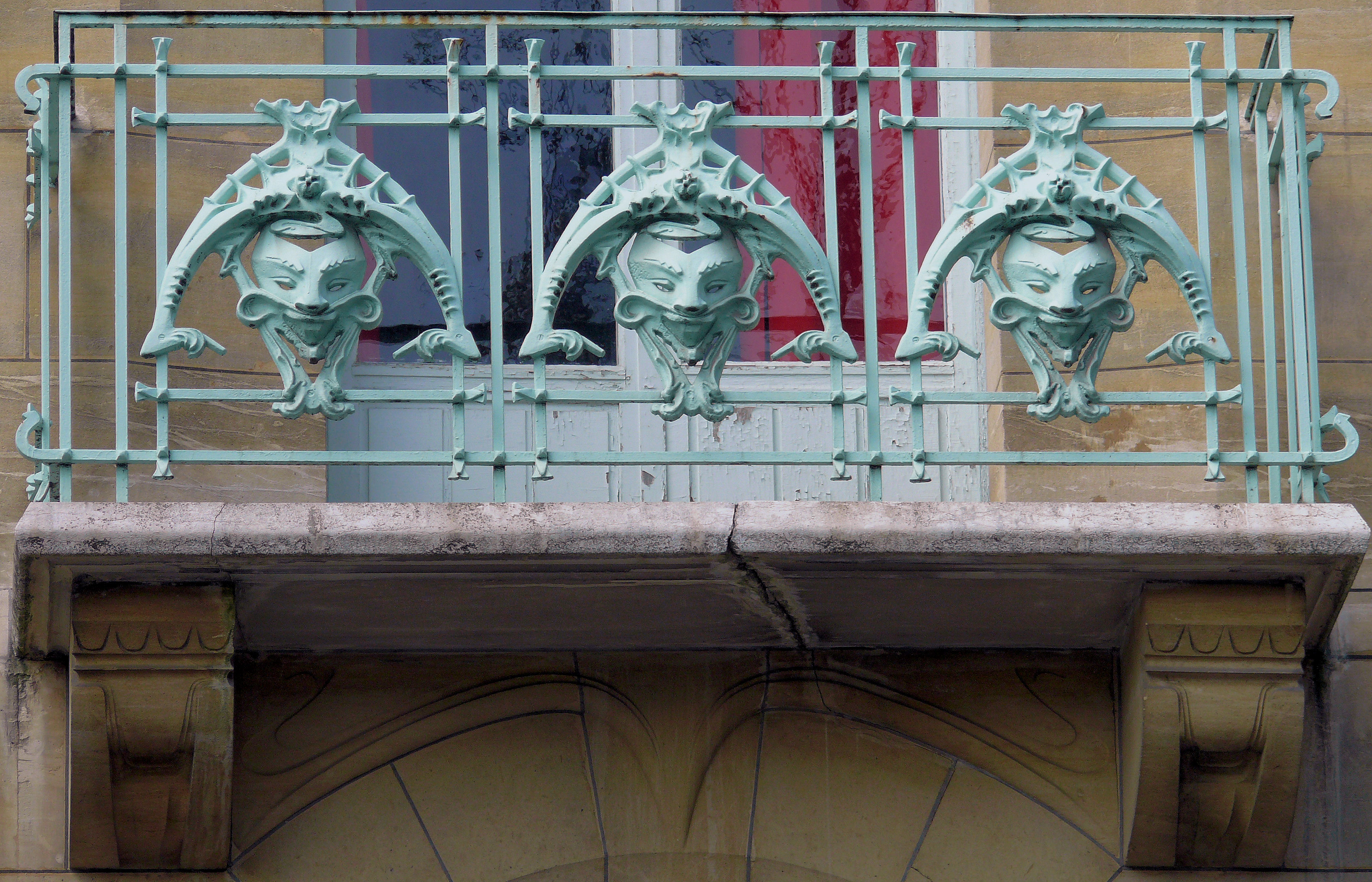
Balcony decoration of Castel Béranger by Hector Guimard (1903)

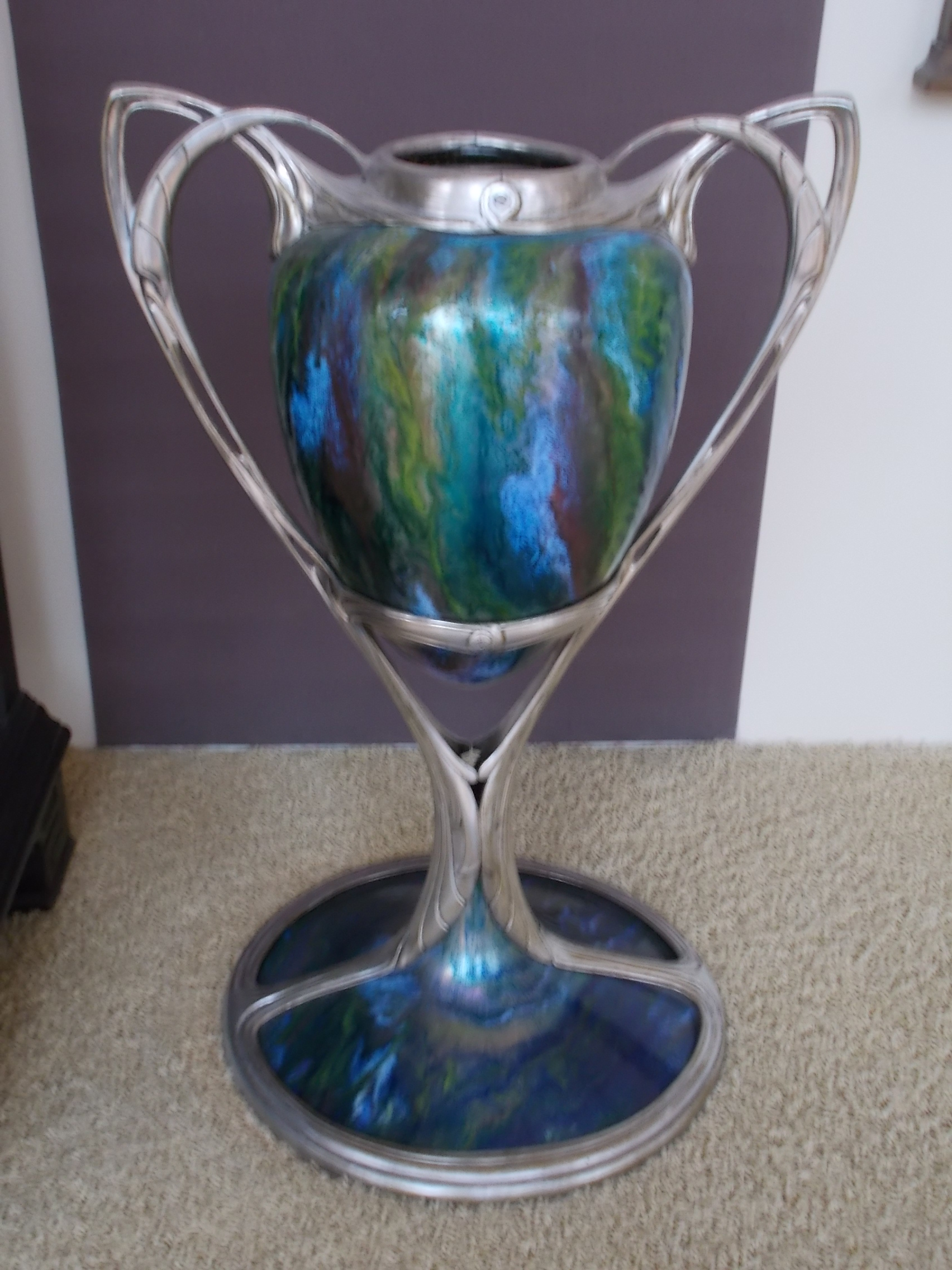
Enameled copper floor vase by Georges de Feure and Jakab Rappaport (1902) (Budapest Museum of Applied Arts)

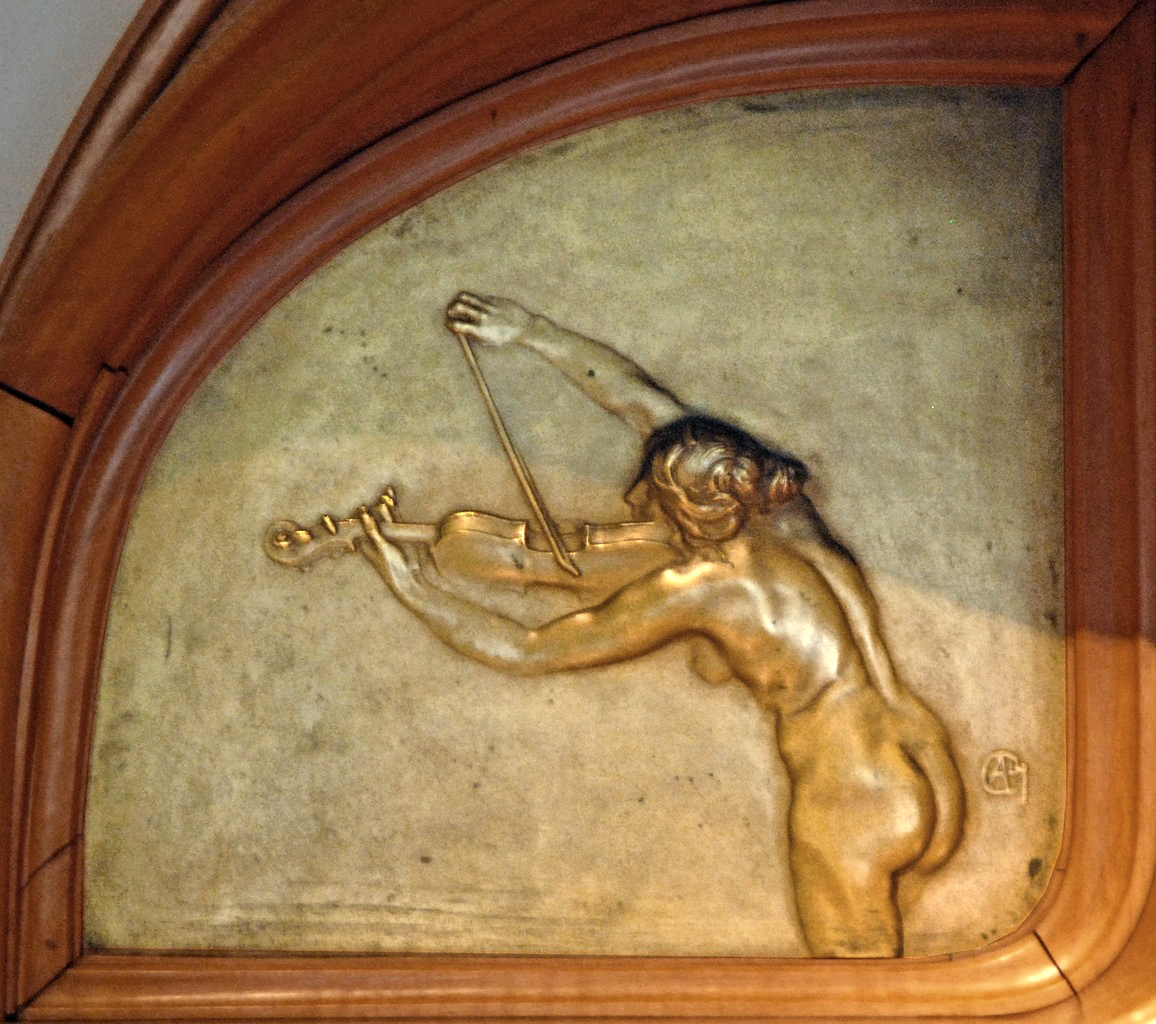
Woman playing a violin, bronze by Georges de Feure (1868–1943).(Musée des Arts Décoratifs)

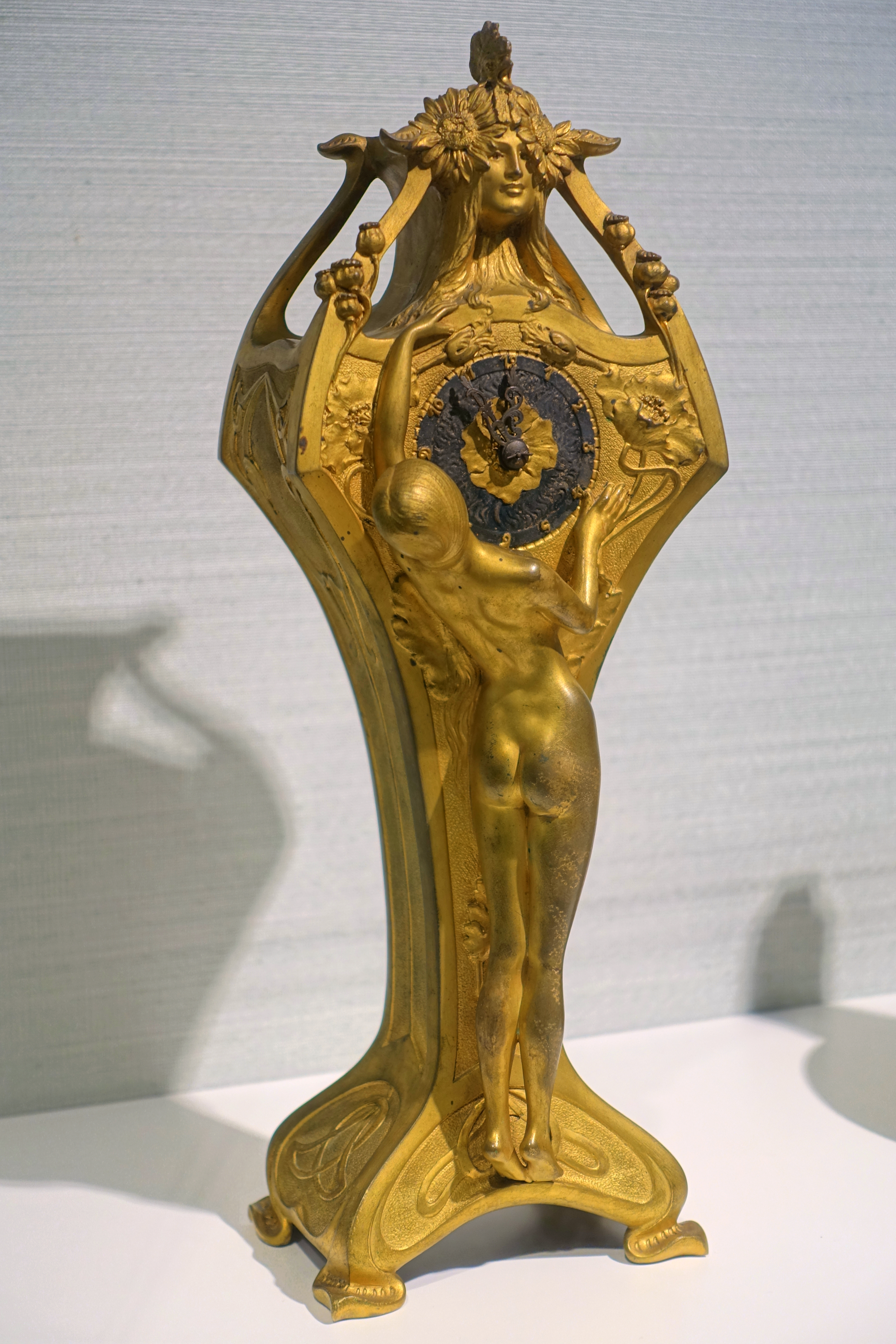
Mantel clock by Louis Chalon and E. Colin, gilded and silvered bronze (c. 1900), (Hessisches Landesmuseum Darmstadt - Darmstadt, Germany)

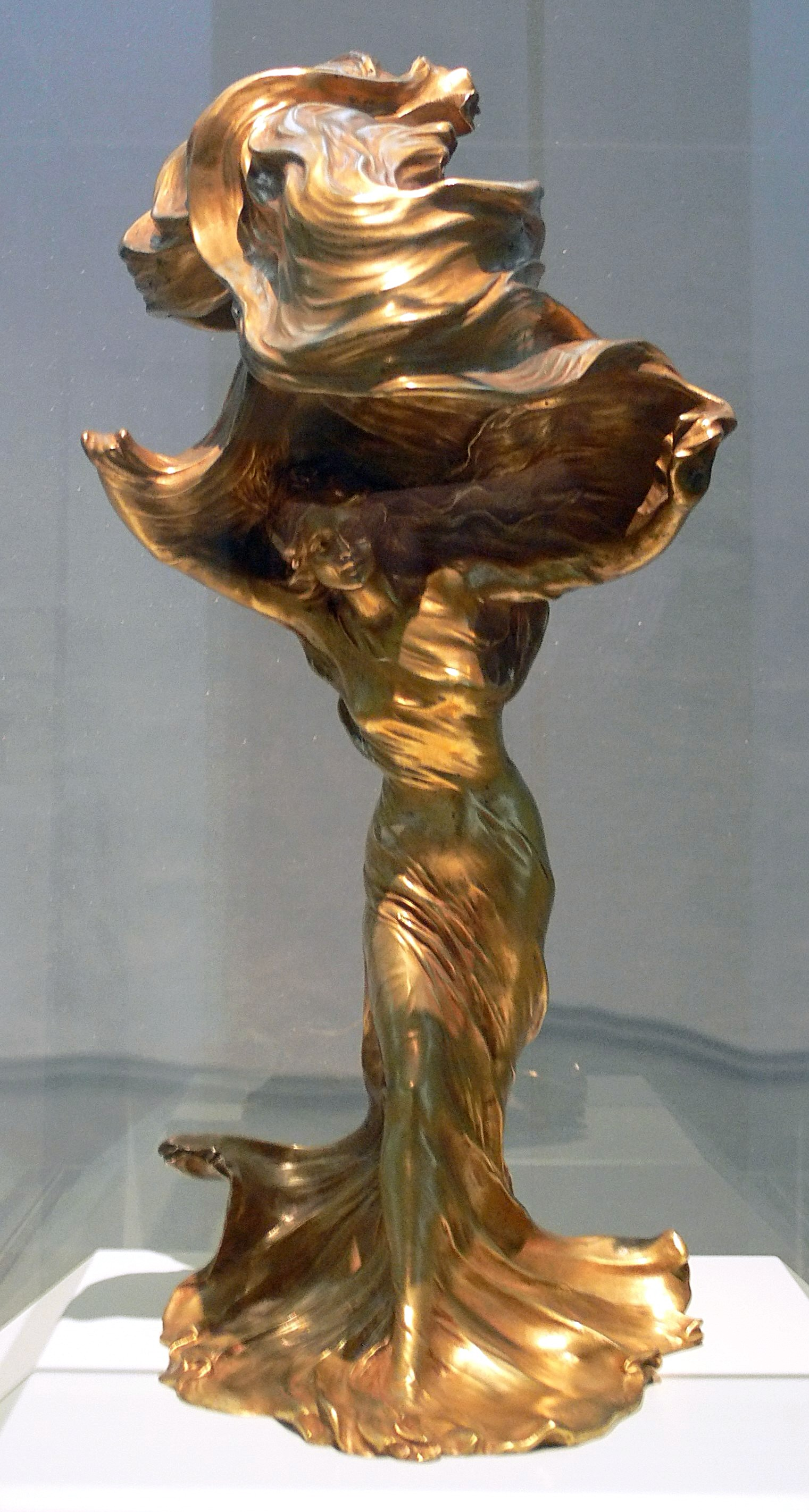
Table Lamp by François-Raoul Larche in gilt bronze, with the dancer Loïe Fuller as model (1901)

== Jewelry ==
Art Nouveau jewelry, modelled after natural and floral forms, was particularly popular. One classic example is the Cascade Pendant designed by Alfons Mucha and made by Fouquet, now on display at the Petit Palais. It represents a cascade of opals, diamonds and slightly misshapen, or "Barocco", pearls, along with gold and enamel. He used opals because of their delicate pale color and misshapen pearls to offer unusual but more natural forms. He also employed circles of tiny diamonds around larger stones to frame and highlight them. The interior of his jewelry shop, designed by Mucha, is now on display at the Carnavalet Museum. The Fouquet firm, headed by Georges Fouquet, and its jewelers borrowed from many different periods and styles.

Most subjects for jewelers were taken from the natural world, including peacocks, butterflies and dragonflies, and flowers. Others were drawn from mythology, or figures of mermaids, themes, butterflies, and mermaids, they also sometimes drew inspiration from the art of Ancient Egypt, China and Japan.

One distinctive feature of Art Nouveau jewelry was that the value of the piece did not depend primarily upon the value of the precious jewels or gold used, as in traditional jewelry. Many of the materials used were semiprecious and oddly-shaped stones and pearls. The value was determined by the imagination and the reputation of the designer.

Mucha and other Art Nouveau illustrators often collaborated with jewelers, Eugène Grasset, best known for his theatrical posters and magazine illustrations, made designs for objects ranging from combs to belt buckles created by Paris jewelers.

René Lalique, best known for glass art, was also a major figure in Paris Art Nouveau jewelry design. Like Fouquet, he combined more traditional materials, such as diamonds and emeralds, with semi-precious stones, amber, ivory, pearls, enamels, horn and other natural materials to create original and imaginative forms. He also used cabochons, which were convex, polished gemstones, rounded rather than faceted. He particularly created diadems and pendants in the form os plants, insects, and mythical figures.

Louis Aucoc and his family firm, where Lalique had been an apprentice, was another important creator of Art Nouveau jewelry. Other notable jewelry creators included Lucien Gaillard, Paul Follot, and Paul and Henri Vever.

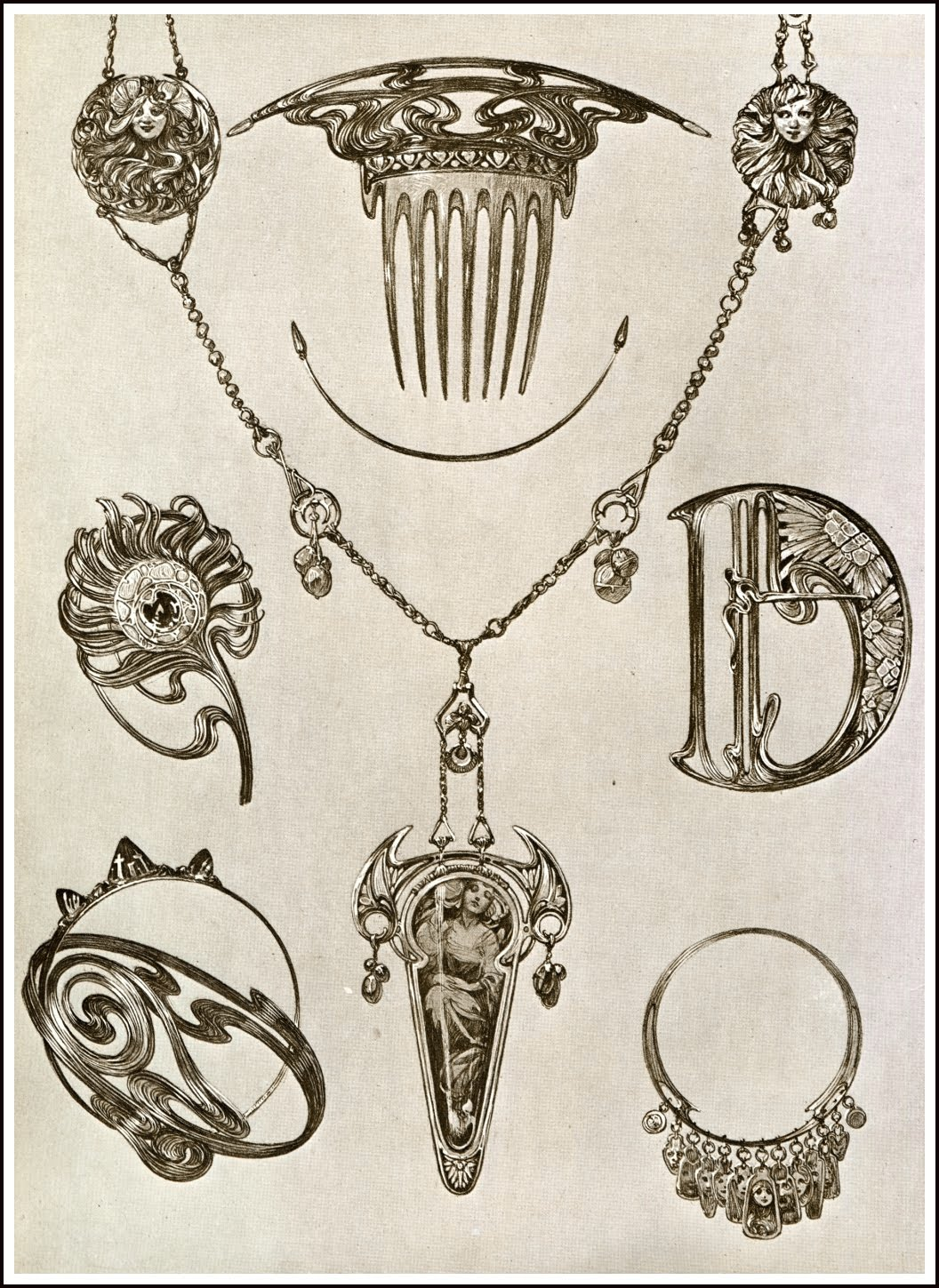
Jewelry designs for Fouquet jewellers by Alfons Mucha (1901)

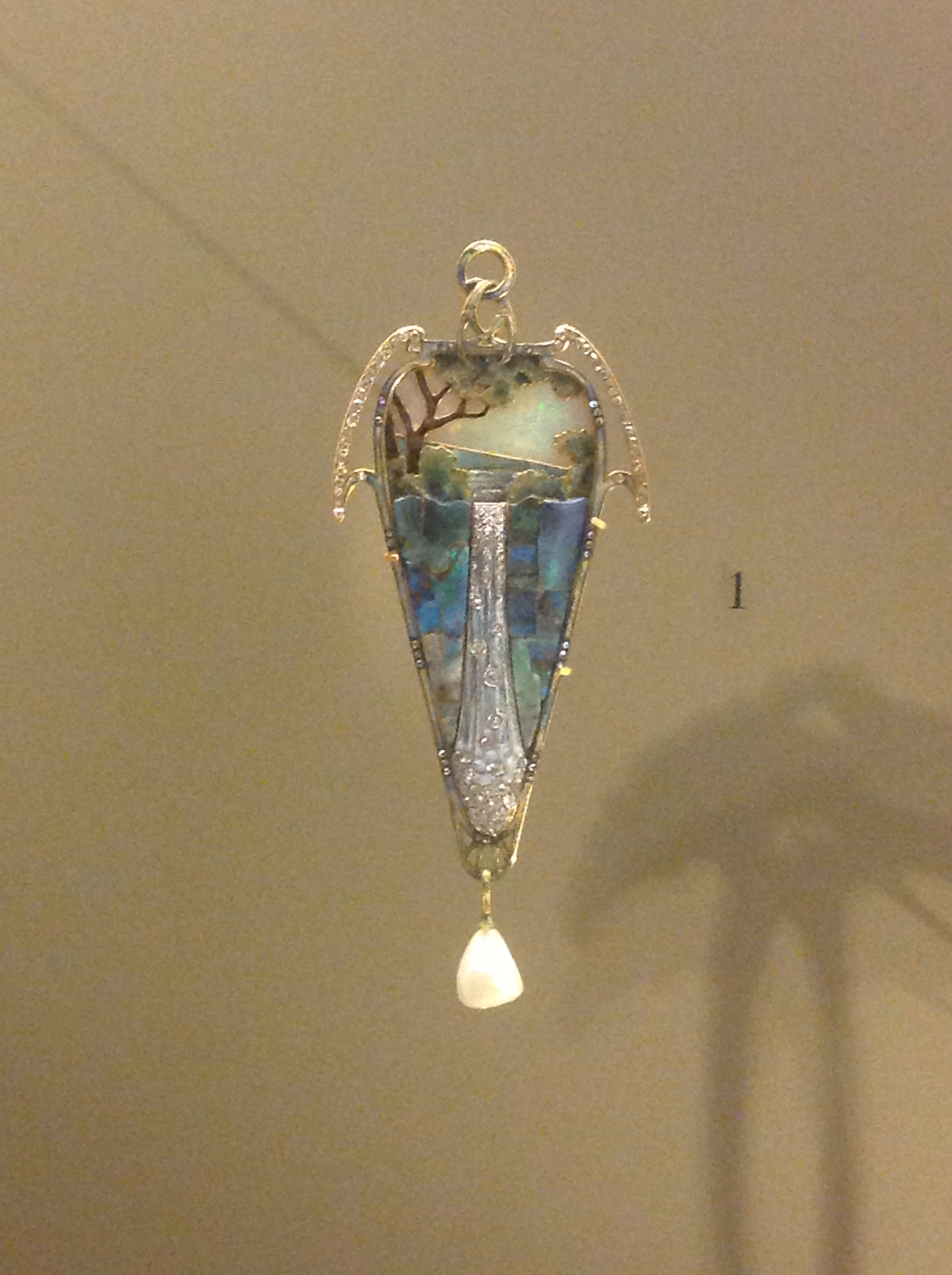
Cascade pendant designed by Alfons Mucha for Fouquet jewelers, (1900). (Petit Palais museum, Paris)

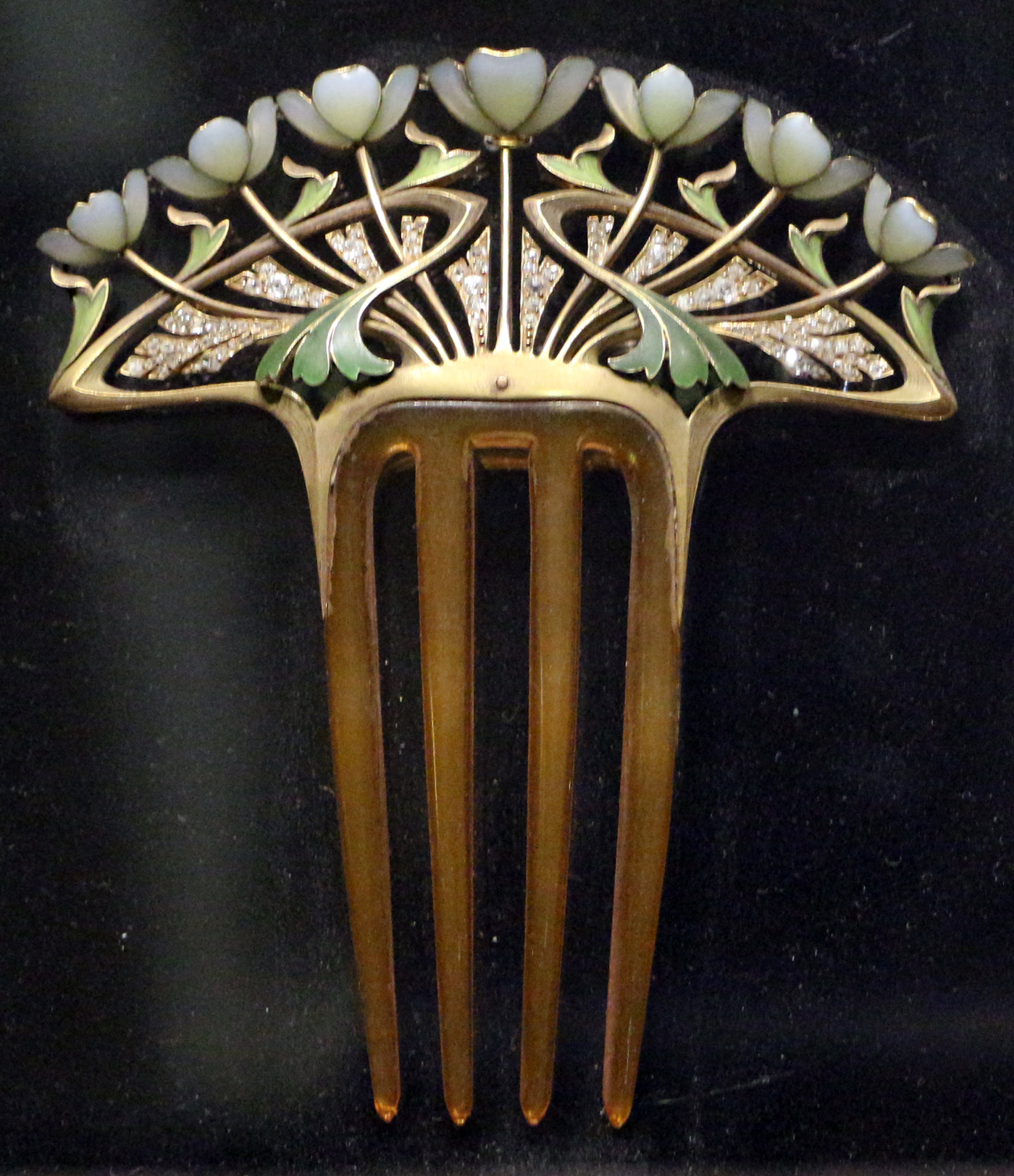
Comb of horn, gold, and diamonds by René Lalique (c. 1902) (Musée d'Orsay)

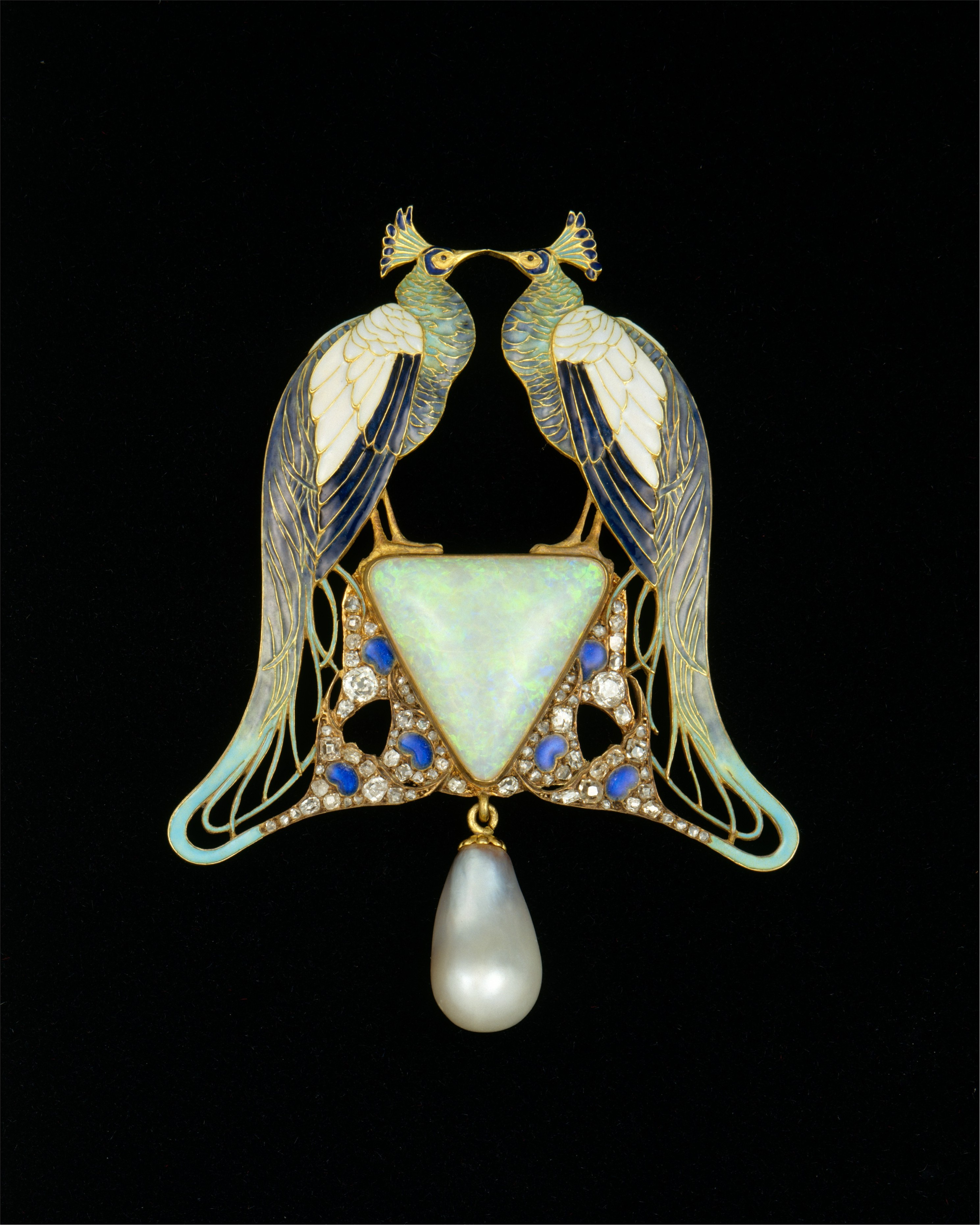
Lalique peacock pendant, of gold, enamel, opal, pearl, and diamonds (Metropolitan Museum) (1900–1903)

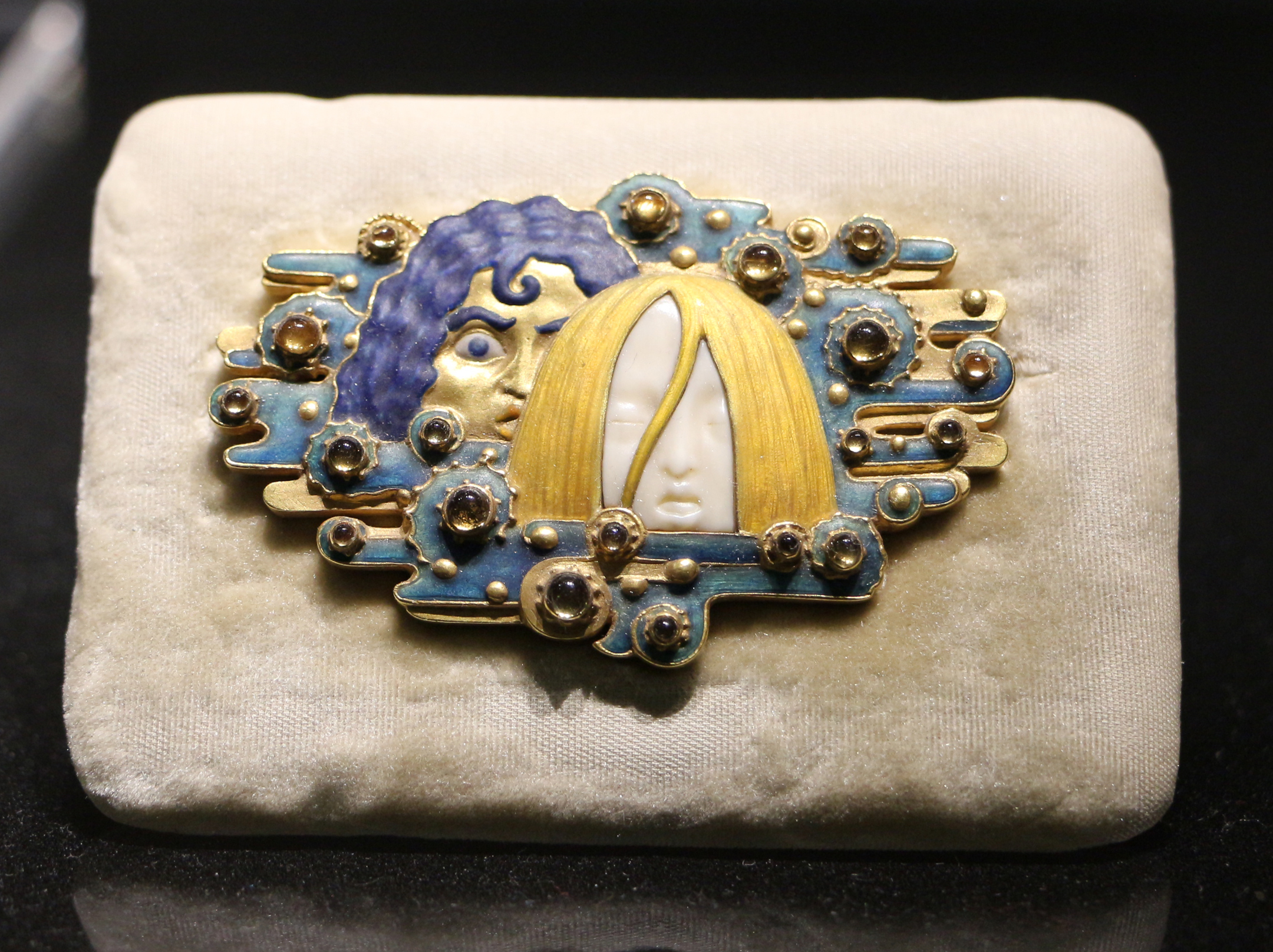
Appearances belt buckle, of gold, ivory, topaz, glazes, and cabachons, or rounded gemstones. designed by Eugène Grasset (c. 1900) (Musée d'Orsay)

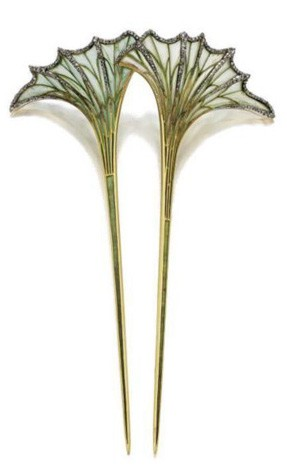
Enamel Fan-shaped leaf pins with small rose-cut diamonds in the veins by Louis Aucoc (c. 1900),

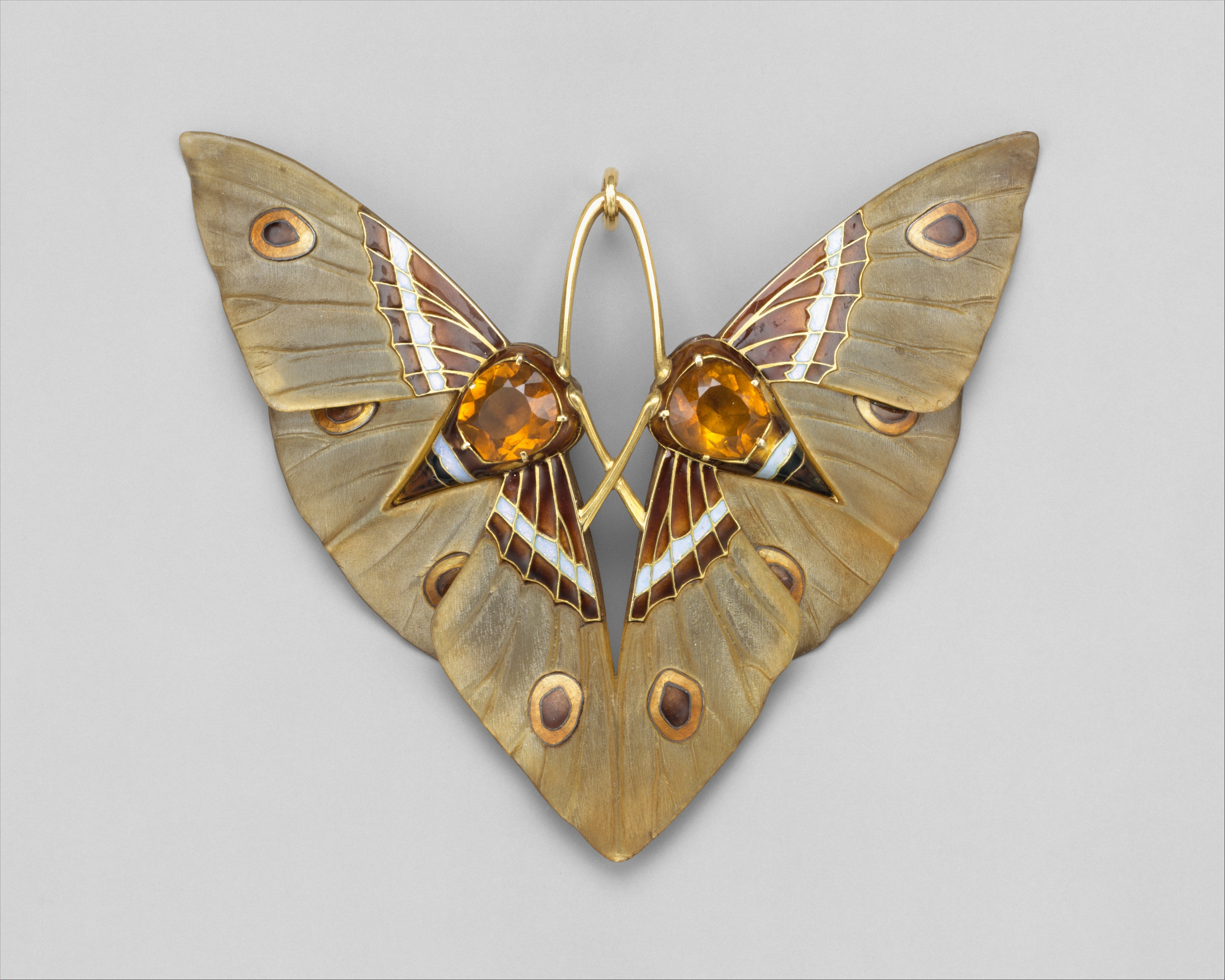
Moth pendant by Lucien Gaillard, of Gold, champlevé enamel, citrines, carved horn;(c. 1900–1902)(Metropolitan Museum)

== Graphic arts ==
Posters and magazine covers, advertisements and illustrations were among the most popular forms of Art Nouveau in Paris. They were made possible by the invention of color lithography in 1879, and further improvements which permitted more colors and mass production of better quality images. The subjects of posters were almost always women, whose long, curling hair became a central element of the design, often combined with flowers and vegetal designs.

Paris in the 1890s was covered with colorful Art Nouveau posters selling bicycles, beverages, medicines, voyages to the South of France, all with the same spirit of movement and gaiety. Alfons Mucha was the best-known of the poster designers, particularly for the theatrical posters he created for actress Sarah Bernhardt, beginning with a memorable poster for her starring role as Gismonda in 1895, Mucha also designed sets and costumes for Bernhardt, as well as jewelry. Bernhardt herself recognized the value of his posters as art objects, and reserved a certain number of posters for sale to collectors.

The skirts and costumes of dancers, flying into billowing forms, were another popular motif, used in the early Art Nouveau by Henri de Toulouse-Lautrec and by Jules Chéret, depicted the dancer Loie Fuller surrounded by a cloud of whirling fabric.

Other important early figures in the genre included Eugène Grasset, who taught at the major schools of graphic arts and design in Paris, and who published books of images in the new style, and Jules Chéret, who became famous for his posters of actresses and dancers in twisting Baroque poses.

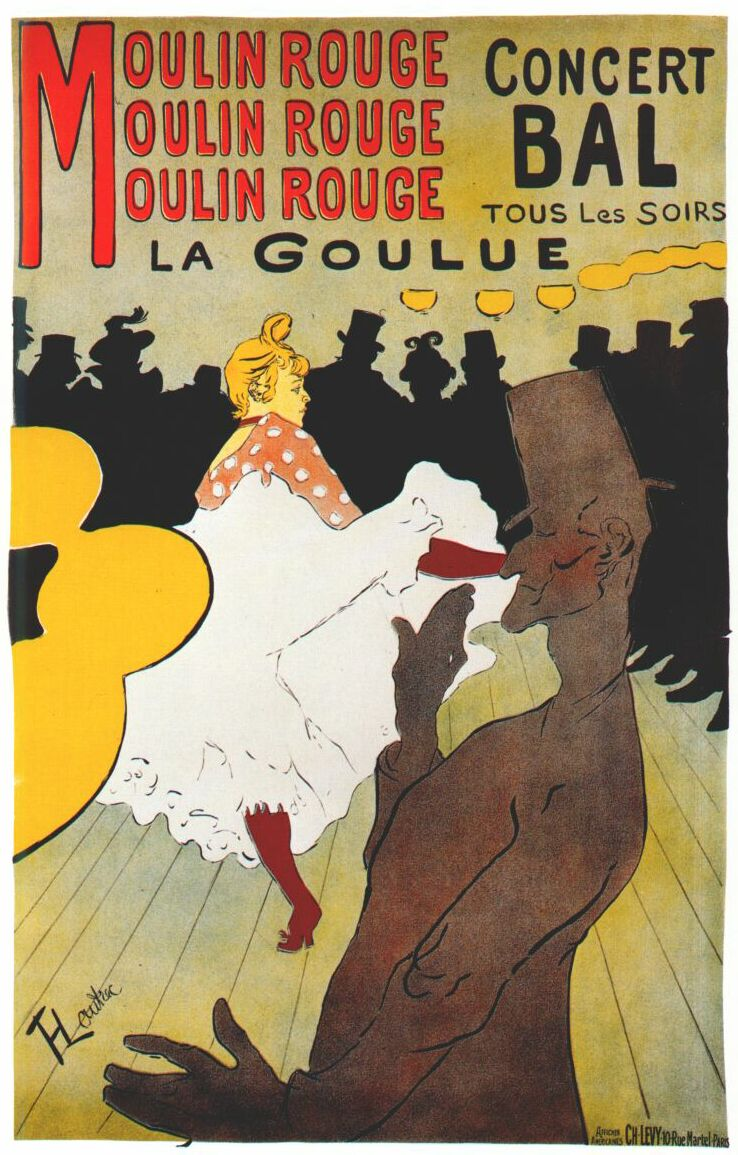
Moulin Rouge poster by Henri de Toulouse-Lautrec (1891)

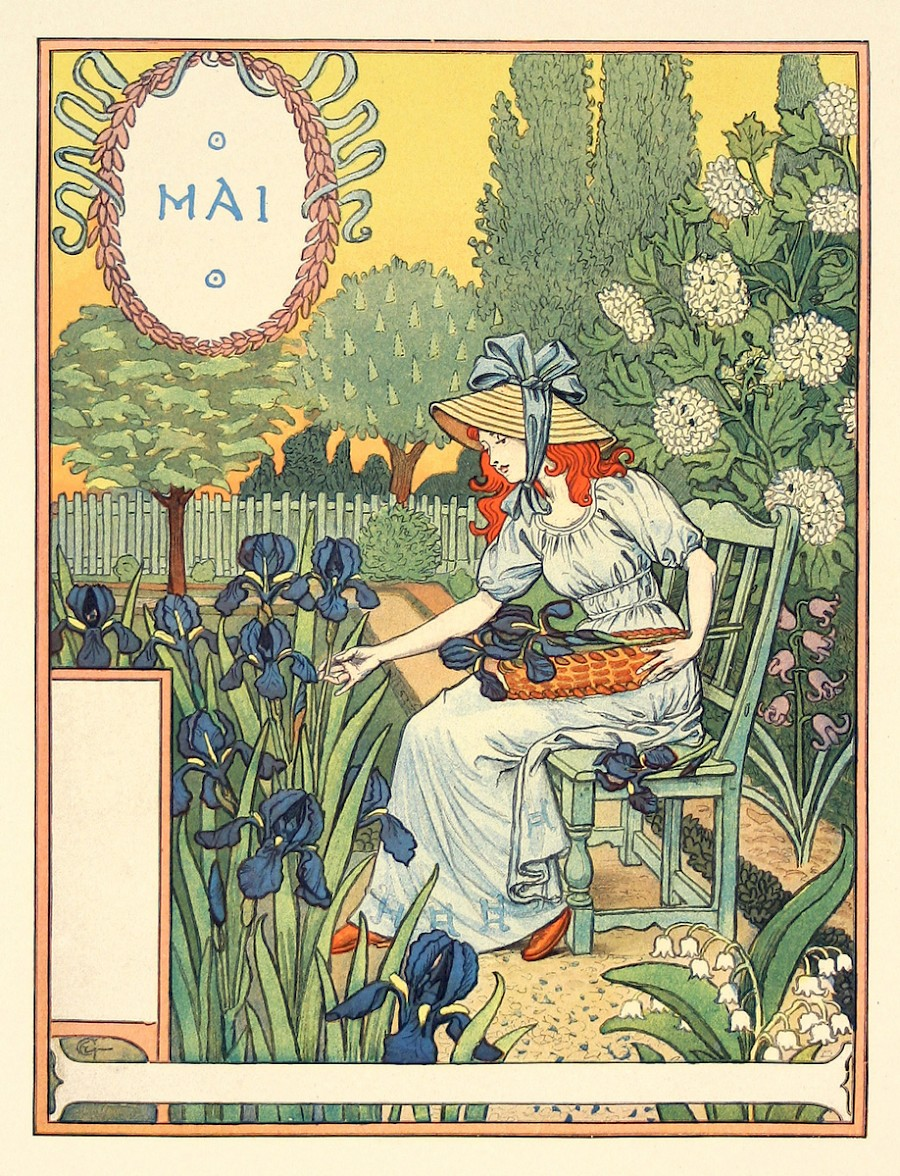
Illustration by Eugène Grasset for La Belle Gardeniere (1893)

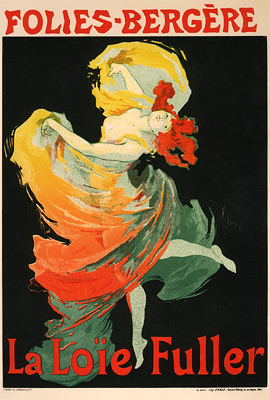
Poster for the dancer Loie Fuller by Jules Chéret (1893)

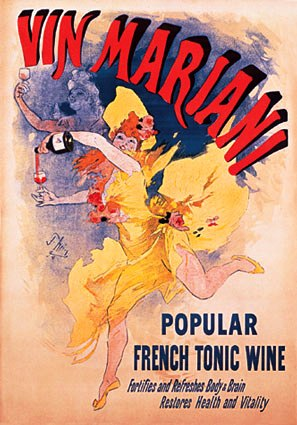
Poster for Vin Mariani by Jules Chéret

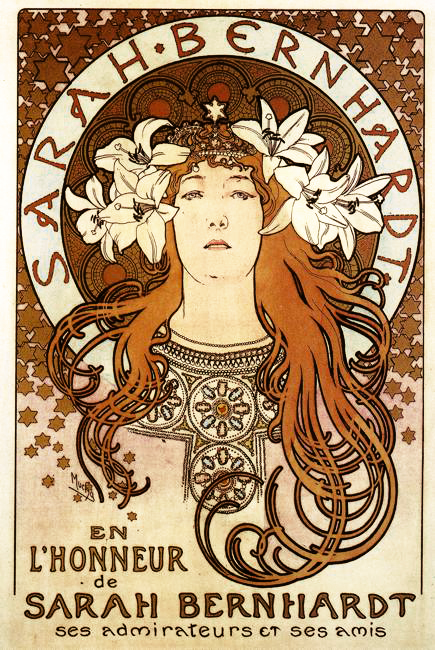
Postsr of Sarah Bernhardt by Alphonse Mucha (1896)

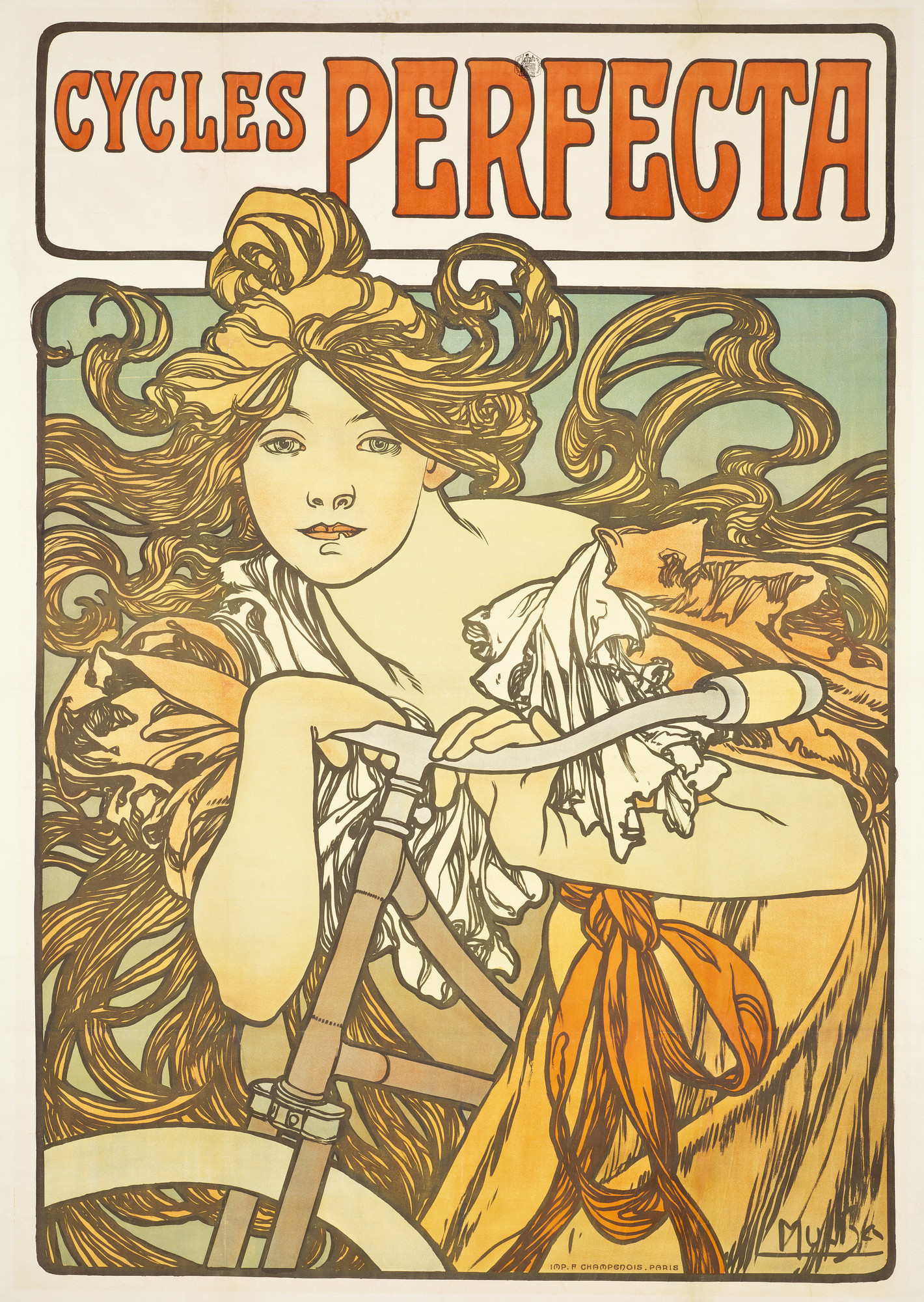
Poster for Perfecta bicycles by Alfons Mucha (1902)

== Painting ==
Art Nouveau painting was decorative, intended to harmonize with architecture and interior design, usually in the form of murals, panels or screens. Most of the major painters of the period, such as Renoir and Monet were considered exclusively studio artists in other schools. However, some painters specifically made work in an Art Nouveau style, specifically for decoration. The best known painters in this category were the members of Les Nabis. Maurice Denis, Pierre Bonnard and the other Nabis often made decorative paintings tailored to particular rooms or settings. They were often inspired by Japanese panel paintings, which had become very popular in Paris during the period, largely through the efforts of Siegfried Bing and his Maison de l'Art Nouveau beginning in 1895. As with other forms of Art Nouveau, the subjects painted were very often women in floral settings. The floral patterns were sometimes in gardens or sometimes on the walls, and were often very stylized and abstract, with a strong Japanese influence. In some cases, the artists created murals; At the end of the Art Nouveau period, Maurice Denis painted an Art Nouveau mural on the interior of the upola of the new Théâtre des Champs-Élysées, Paris (1908–11)

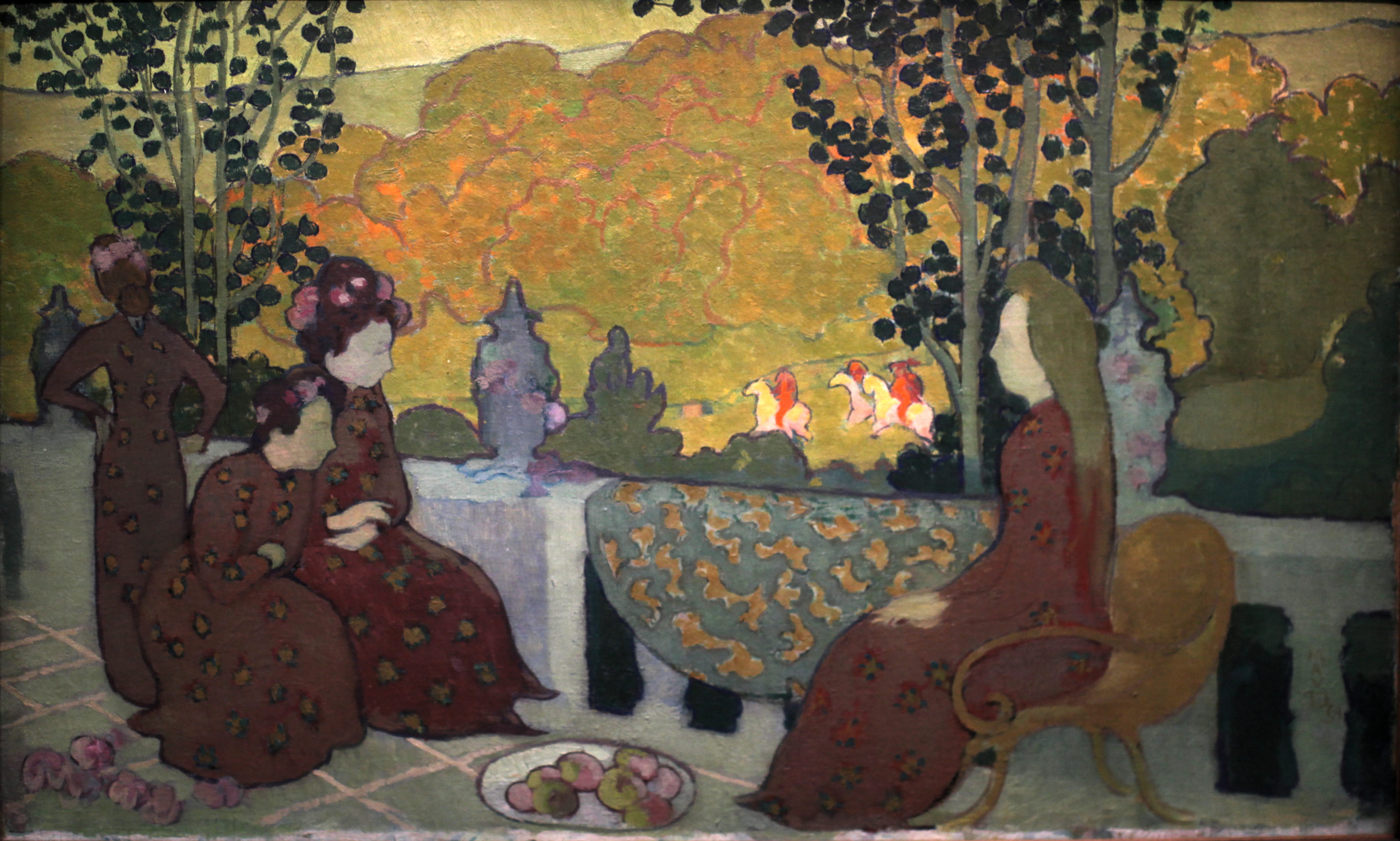
Maurice Denis, Evening in September (1891)

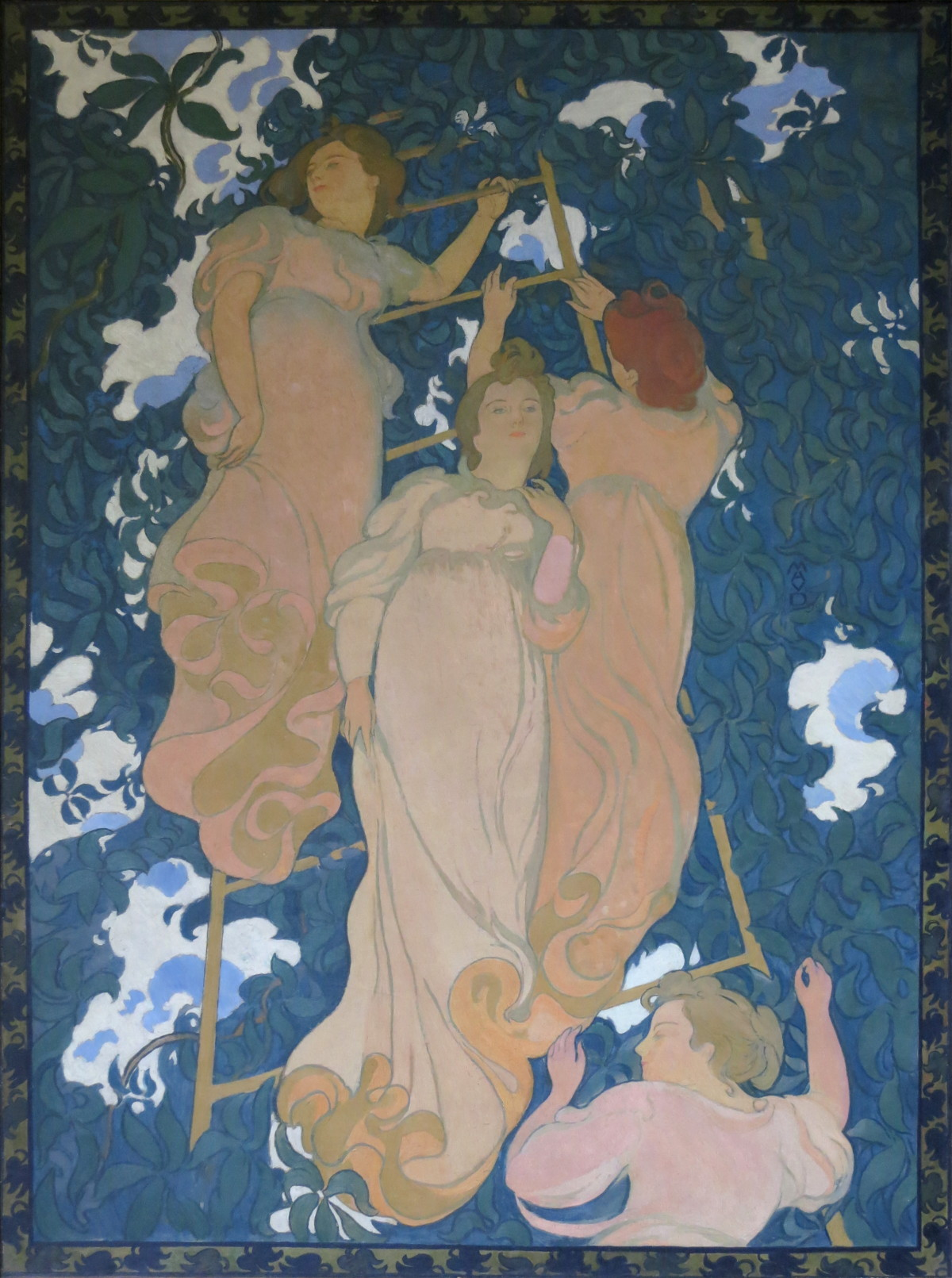
The Ladder in the foliage by Maurice Denis (1892), canvas on a wood panel, made for the ceiling of the home of art patron Henry Lerolle. The same woman on the ladder is seen from four points of view.

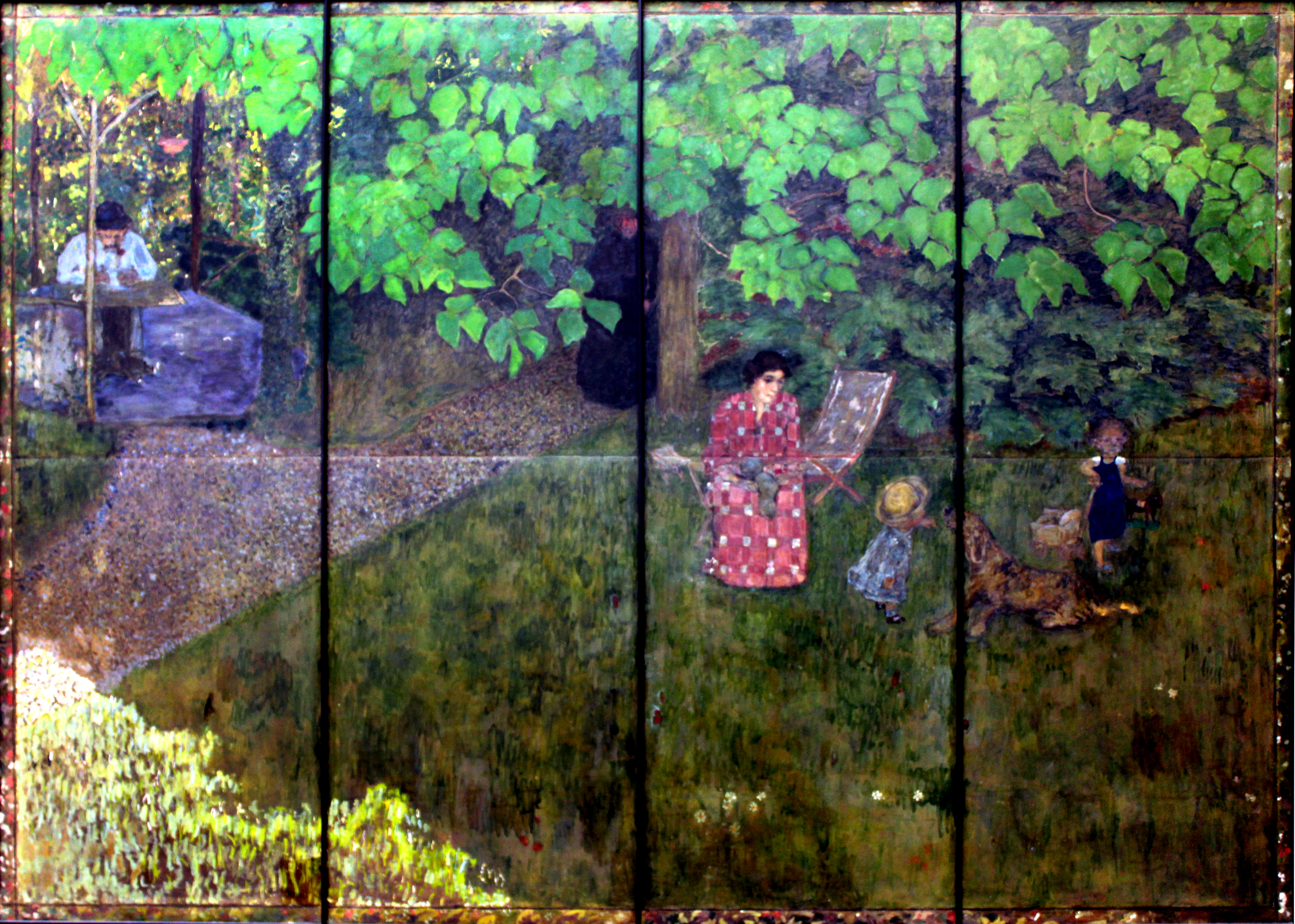
Painted screen; the Bonnard family in the garden (1896), Alte Nationalgalerie

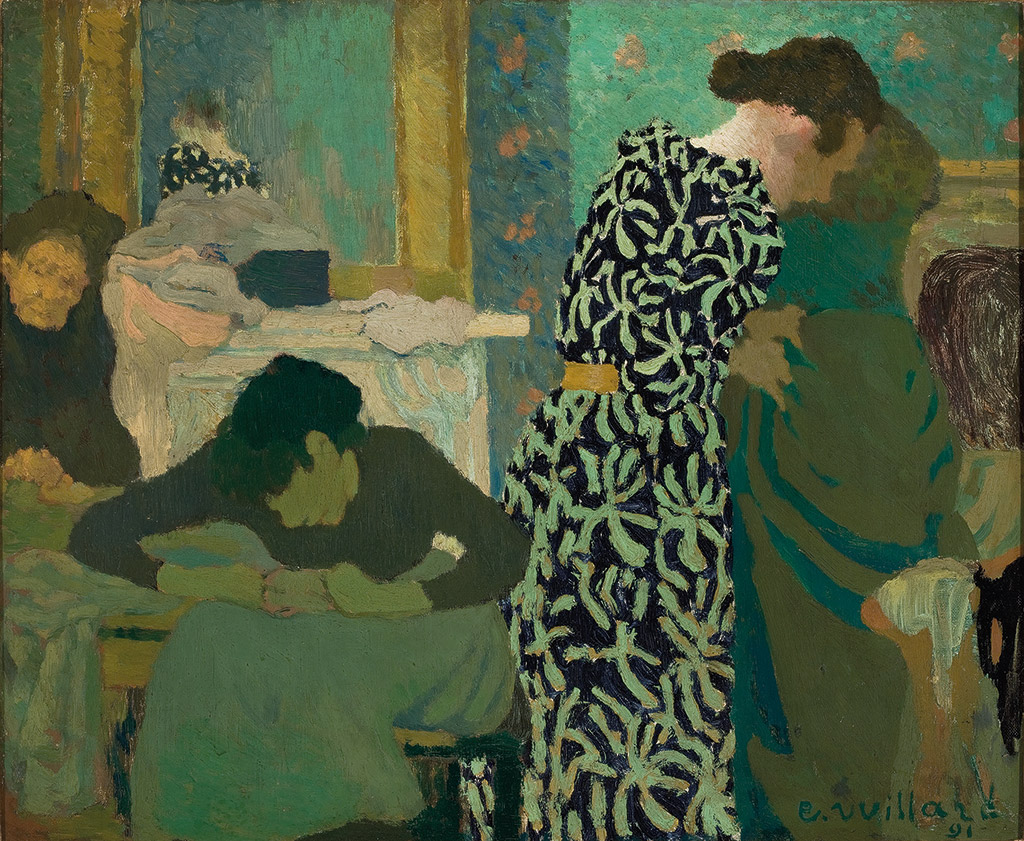
The printed dress by Édouard Vuillard (1891), Museu de Arte de São Paulo

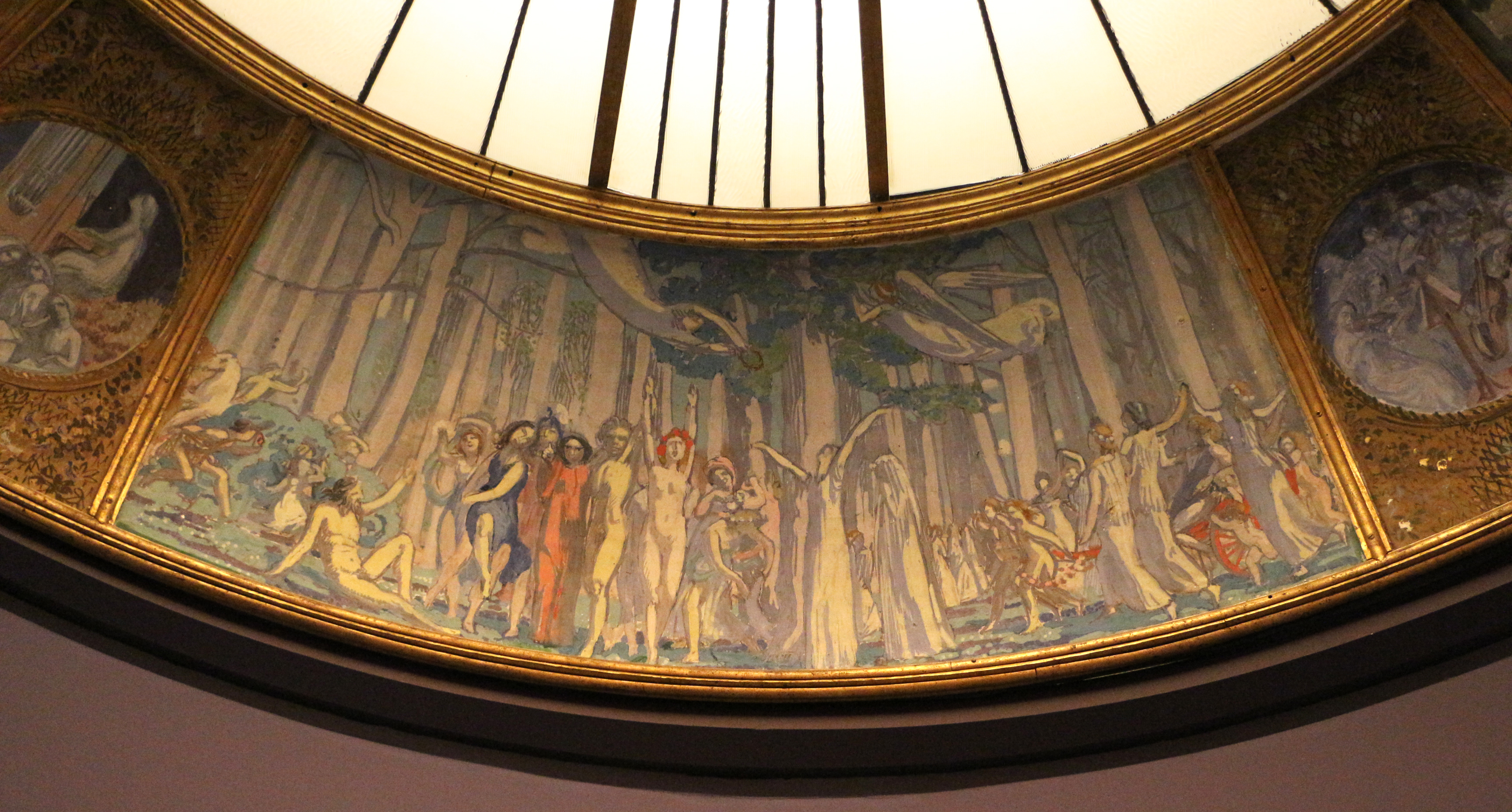
Portion of the mural for the cupola of the Théâtre des Champs-Élysées, Paris (1908–11)

== Paris museums with Art Nouveau collections ==
Several Paris museums have notable collections of art, design and architecture from the period. They include:

- The Musée d'Orsay (paintings, furniture, sculpture)
- The Musée des Arts Decoratifs, or Museum of Decorative Arts, next to the Louvre. Furniture, glass, jewelry, porcelain,
- The Musée Carnavalet of the history of Paris. Reconstructed rooms, objects.
- Petit Palais. Exhibits of jewelry, painting, and the dining room furniture of the Hotel Guimard.
- Maxim's Art Nouveau "Collection 1900". Private museum over Maxim's restaurant. Groups only.

== Bibliography ==
- Bony, Anne, L'Architecture Moderne, Paris, Larousse (2012) ISBN 978-2-03-587641-6
- Bouillon, Jean-Paul (1985). Journal de L'Art Nouveau. Paris: Skira. ISBN 2-605-00069-9.
- Bouillon, Jean-Paul (2006). Maurice Denis – Le spirituel dans l'art (in French). Paris: Gallimard. ISBN 2-07-031929-6.
- Duncan, Alastair, Art Nouveau, World of Art, New York: Thames and Hudson, 1994. ISBN 0-500-20273-7
- Fahr-Becker, Gabriele (2015). L'Art Nouveau (in French). H.F. Ullmann. ISBN 978-3-8480-0857-5.
- Lahor, Jean (2007) [1901]. L'Art nouveau (in French). Baseline Co. Ltd. ISBN 978-1-85995-667-0.
- Ormiston, Rosalind; Robinson, Michael (2013). Art Nouveau – Posters, Illustration and Fine Art. Flame Tree Publishing. ISBN 978-1-84786-280-8.
- Plum, Gilles (2014). Paris architectures de la Belle Époque. Éditions Parigramme. ISBN 978-2-84096-800-9.
- Poisson, Michel (2009). 1000 Monuments de Paris.
- Renault, Christophe; Lazé, Christophe (2006). les Styles de l'architecture et du mobilier (in French). Éditions Jean-Paul Gisserot. ISBN 978-2-87747-465-8.
- Riley, Noël (2004). Grammaire des Arts Décoratifs (in French). Flammarion.
- Sato, Tamako (2015). Alphonse Mucha - the Artist as Visionary. Cologne: Taschen. ISBN 978-3-8365-5009-3.
- Sembach, Klaus-Jürgen (2013). L'Art Nouveau- L'Utopie de la Réconciliation (in French). Taschen. ISBN 978-3-8228-3005-5.
- Texier, Simon (2012). Paris- Panorama de l'architecture. Parigramme. ISBN 978-2-84096-667-8.
- Thiébaut, Philippe (2018). Mucha et l'Art Nouveau (in French). Paris: Éditions du Chêne. ISBN 978-2-81231-806-1.
