= Lavirotte =

Lavirotte may refer to:

- Jules Lavirotte (1864–1929), French architect
- Lavirotte Building, apartment building in Paris
- Audibert & Lavirotte, French automobile
