= Concours de façades de la ville de Paris =

Architecture competition in France

The concours de façades de la ville de Paris was an architecture competition organized by the Conseil Municipal of Paris in the Third Republic, at the very end of the 19th century and beginning of the 20th century.

== History ==
The contest was held annually between the first on 16 December 1897 and the late 1930s, with an interruption during World War I. It recognized several buildings completed during the year.

In instituting the contest, the city of Paris took inspiration from Concours d'architecture de la Ville de Bruxelles (1872-1876) and the Prix Godecharle in Brussels. The Parisian contest was originally set up after the creation of the Rue Réaumur in 1897 in order to promote the construction of original and attractive buildings on that street following the relaxation of Baron Haussmann's strict rules of architecture. Initially restricted to the Rue Réaumur, the competition was soon extended to the whole of Paris.

Most years saw roughly 57 buildings entering the competition, designed by 55 or so architects, usually resulting in six winners.

Every year until the first world war, the jury was made up of five members of the Conseil Municipal de Paris : Quentin-Bauchart, Ernest Caron, Froment-Meurice, Chérioux, Ballières, Joseph Antoine Bouvard, director of Architectural Services, and Nicolas Sauger (1838-1918), architectural overseer for the city of Paris. Lastly two jury members were elected by the contestants annually and in 1904 they were; Jean-Louis Pascal and Joseph Auguste Émile Vaudremer.

== Winners ==
(partial list)

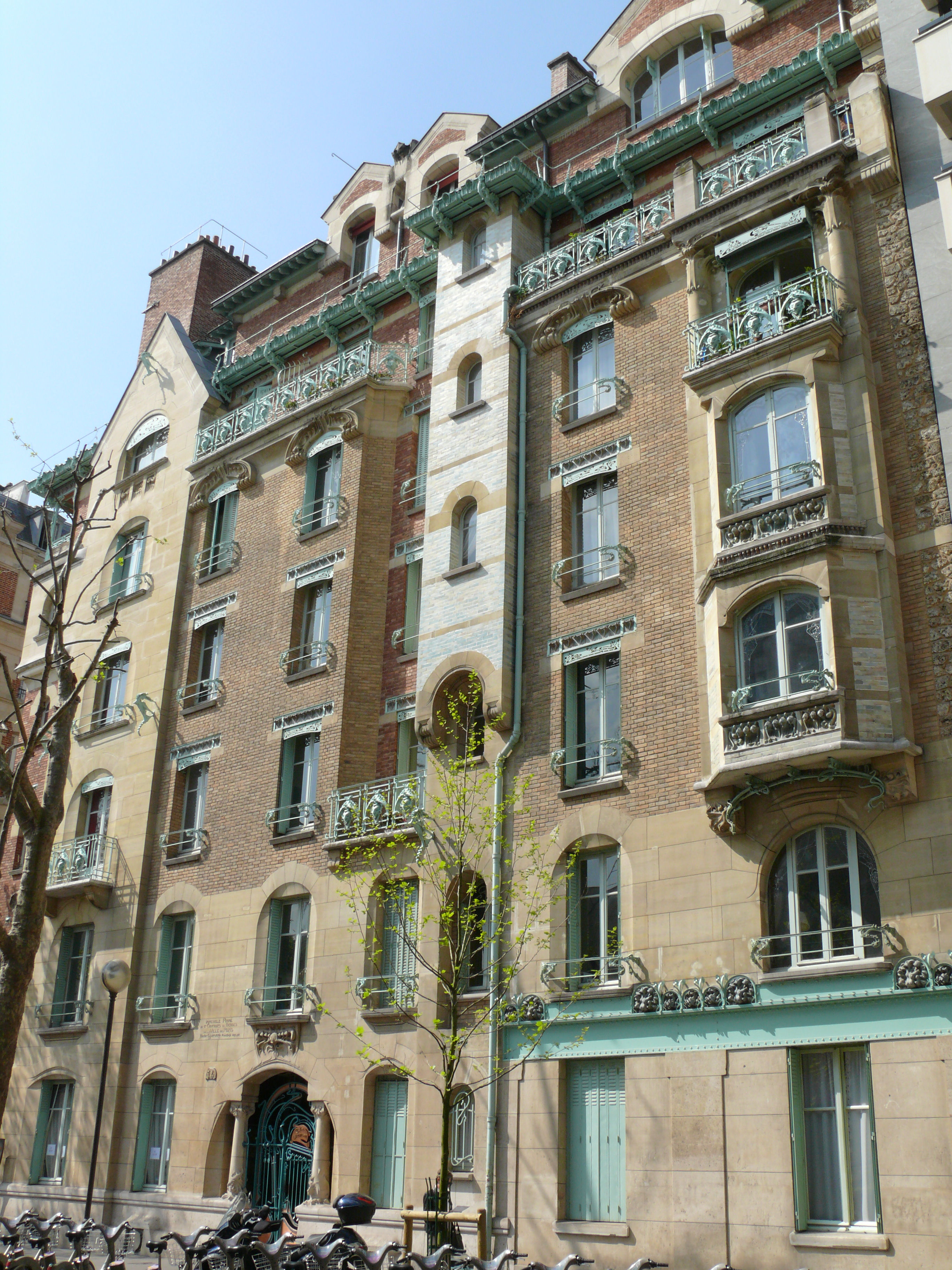
- Castel Béranger, Hector Guimard, 1898
  1898:
  - Hector Guimard, castel Béranger, 14 rue Jean-de-La-Fontaine, 16th arrondissement of Paris.
  - Georges Debrie, 24 rue du Roi-de-Sicile, 4th
  - Charles Breffendille, 18 rue Croix-des-Petits-Champs, 1st
  - Louis-Pierre Marquet, 204 rue de Grenelle, 7th
  - Henri Bunel and Fernand Dupuis, 39 rue d'Antin, 2nd
  - Michel Rabier, 87 boulevard de la Villette, 10th
- 1899:
  - Richard Bouwens van der Boijen, 8 rue de Lota, 16th.
  - 17 avenue de Breteuil, 7th
  - Eugène Bruneau, 270 boulevard Raspail, 14th
  - Alexandre Marcel, 17 avenue de Breteuil, 7th
  - Georges Morin-Goustiaux, 1 rue Le Peletier, 9th
  - Gustave Rives, 45 rue du Château-d'Eau, 10th
- 1900:
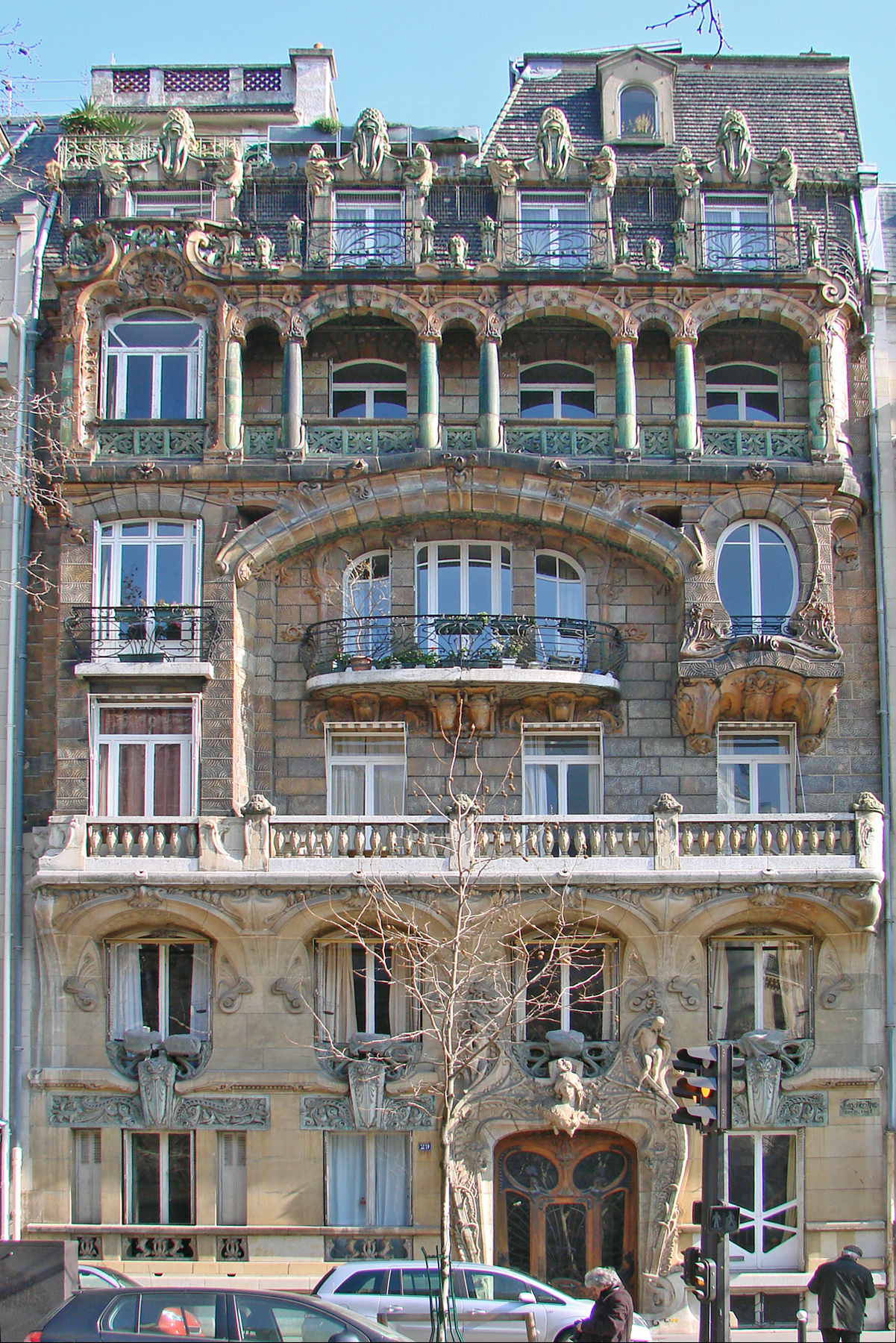
  Lavirotte building, Jules Lavirotte, 1901
  - Edouard Arnaud rue Octave Feuillet, 16th
  - Édouard Perrone, 3 rue Danton, 6th
  - Gustave Goy, 21 rue Monsieur, 7th
  - Jacques Hermant, 85-87 rue du Faubourg-Saint-Martin
  - Paul Legriel, 170 rue de la Convention, 15th
  - Albert le Voisvenel, 81 rue Malakoff, 16th
- 1901:
  - Jules Lavirotte, Lavirotte Building, 29 avenue Rapp, 7th.
  - Gaston Dupommereulle, 201 bis Boulevard Saint-Germain, 7th
  - G. Pasquier, 201 boulevard Saint-Germain, 7th
  - Alphonse Fiquet, 38-40 rue Condorcet, 9th
  - Paul Noël, place des Saussayes, 8th
  - Charles Labro, 4-6 rue de l'Abbaye, 6th
- 1902:
  - Jacques Muscat, 45 rue de Bellechasse, 7th
  - Henri-Paul Nénot, 17 rue Lafitte, 9th
  - Charles Labouret, 23 rue de Mogador, 9th
  - Maurice Hodanger, 38 bis rue Fabert, 7th
  - Adolphe Bocage, 133 boulevard de Ménilmontant, 11th
  - Henry Delage, 164-166 rue de Courcelles, 17th
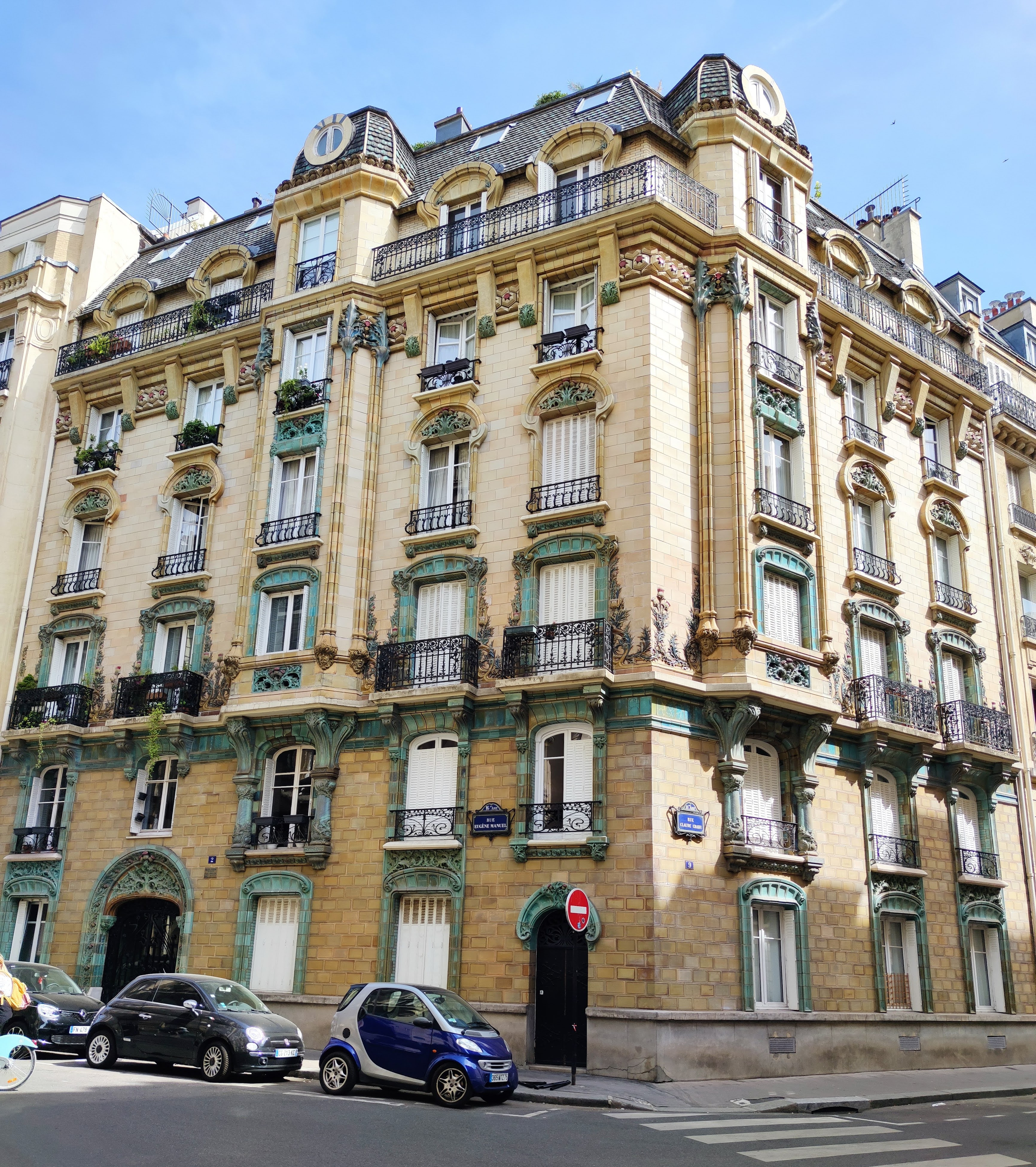
- Immeuble Les Chardons, Charles Klein, 1903
  1903:
  - Charles Klein, immeuble Les Chardons, 9 rue Claude-Chahu and 2 rue Eugène-Manuel, 16th.
  - Stéphane Natanson, 98 avenue de Malakoff, 16th
  - Paul Friesé, 98 quai de la Rapée, 12th
  - Armand Sibien, 250 rue Saint-Honoré, 8th
  - A. Walwein, 96 rue Beaubourg, 4e
  - Charles Goujon, 51 rue Damrémont, 18th
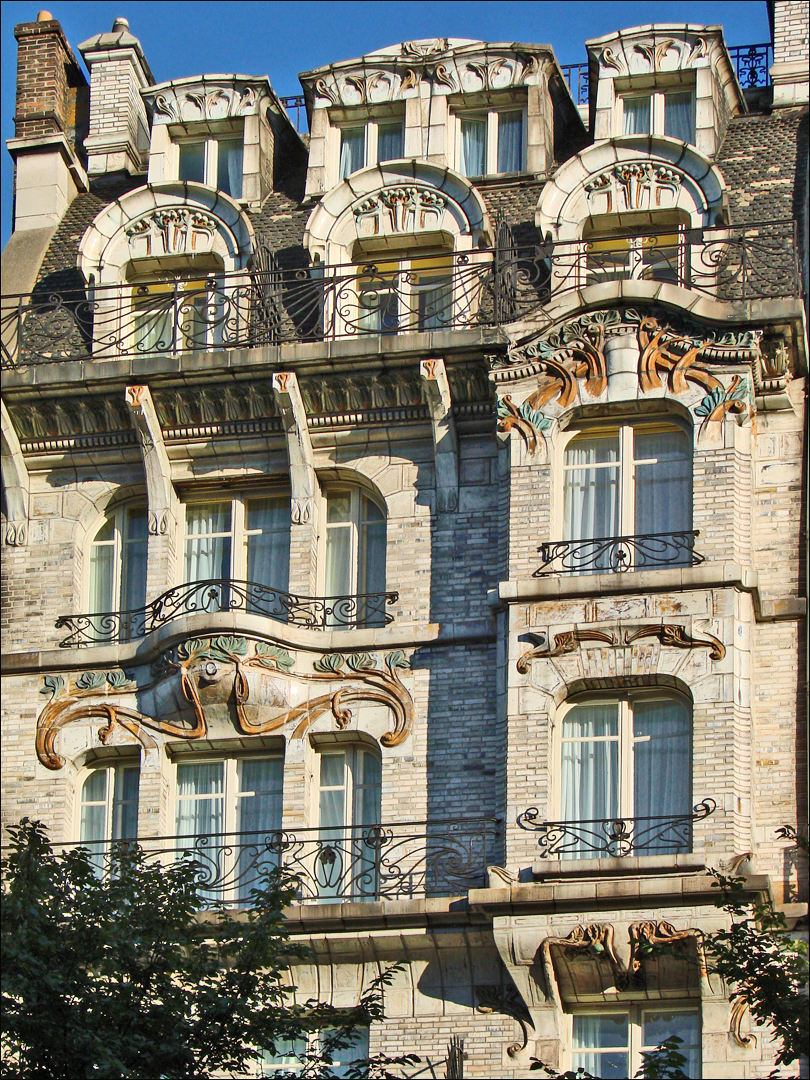
- Hôtel Céramic, Jules Lavirotte, 1905
  1904:
  - Albert Benz, 26 rue François 1er
  - Roger Bouvard and Gustave Umbdenstock, 10 rue Alphand, 13th
  - Michel Le Tourneau, 36 rue de Bellechasse, 7th
  - Louis Parent, 19 rue Spontini, 16th
  - Georges Pradelle, 6 rue de Luynes, 7th
- 1905:
  - Jules Lavirotte, Céramic Hôtel, 34 avenue de Wagram, 8th
  - Théophile Leclerc, 48 rue Neuve-des-Petits-Champs, 2nd
  - Pellechet, 9 rue Pillet-Will, 9th
  - Auguste Garriguenc, 48 bis rue de Rivoli, 4th
  - Hans-Georg Tersling, 41-49 rue de la Faisanderie, 16th
  - Joseph Charlet and F. Perrin, 43 rue des Couronnes, 20th
- 1906:
  - Henri Deglane, 90 rue de Grenelle, 7th
  - Louis-Pierre Marquet, 14 rue de la Pitié
  - Ernest Picard, 8 rue Dehodencq, 16th
  - Louis Sortais, 7 and 7 bis rue de Paradis, 10th
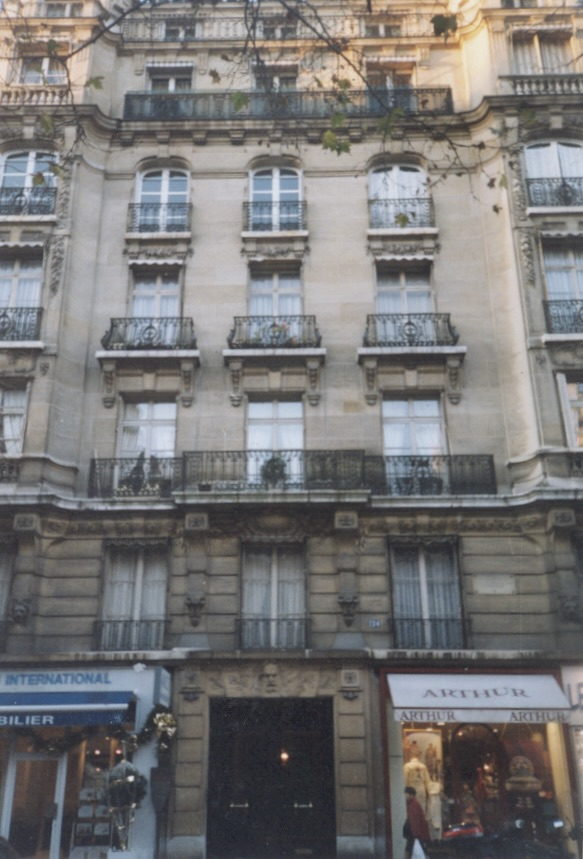
- 124, avenue Victor-Hugo, P. Humbert, 1907.
  1907:
  - P. Humbert, 124 avenue Victor-Hugo, 16th
  - Jules Lavirotte, 23 avenue de Messine, 17th
  - Félix Le Nevé and Albert d'Hont, 44 rue de Bassano, 8th
  - Marcel Auburtin, 13 rue de la Paix, 2nd
  - Eugène Chifflot, 110 boulevard Raspail, 6th
  - Bruno Pelissier, 51 rue Saint-Georges, 9th
- 1908:
  - Mourzelas, 77 avenue Parmentier, 11th
  - Joseph Cassien-Bernard and Paul Friesé, 11 rue Pillet-Will, 9th
  - Emile Jarlat, 82 rue Saint-Lazare, 9th
  - Charles Stoullig, 83 avenue Henri-Martin, 16th
  - Jean Naville and Achille Chauquet, 42, cours de la Reine, 8th
  - Roger Bouvard, 23 rue de la Paix, 2nd
- 1909:
  - Charles Roussi, 64 rue Pergolèse, 16th
  - Henry Duray and Godon, 2 avenue de Camoëns, 16th
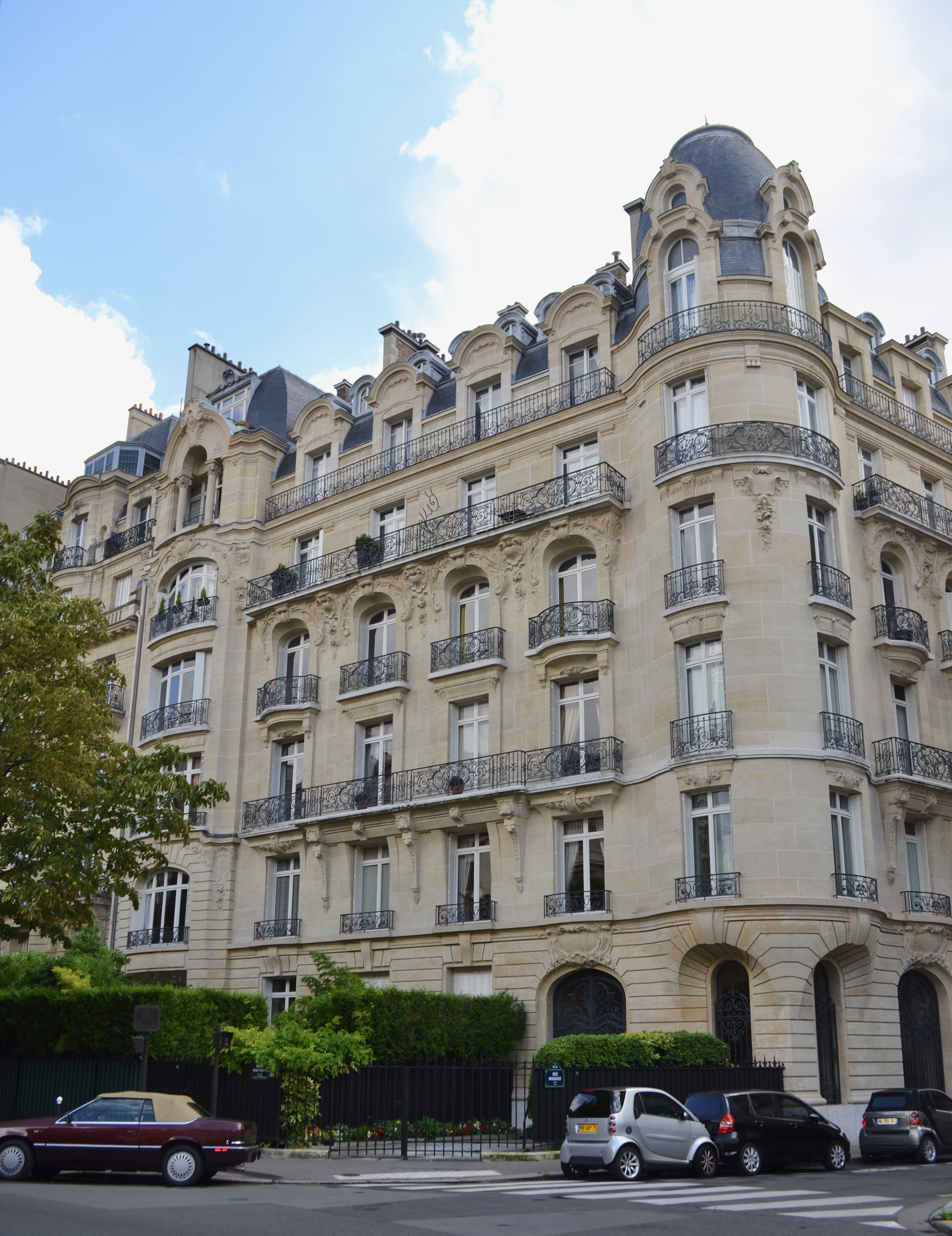
    83 avenue Henri Martin, Charles Stoullig, 1908
  - Albert Turin and Maurice Turin, 6 rue Fessart, 19th
  - Jules Formigé and Emmanuel Gonse, 6 rue Dufrenoy, 16th
  - Rigaud, Charles Duval and Emmanuel Gonse, 6 rue aux Ours, 3rd
  - P. Rigaud, Charles Duval, Emmanuel Gonse, 4 bis rue aux Ours, 3rd
- 1910:
  - Charles Dupuy, 24 avenue de Saxe, 15th
  - Prosper Bobin and Maurice Sandoz, 10 rue Pierre-Curie
  - Georges Bourgouin, 9 rue Lalo, 16th
  - Léon and René Carrier, 84 avenue Niel, 17th
  - Ernest Picard, 4 rue Verdi, 16th
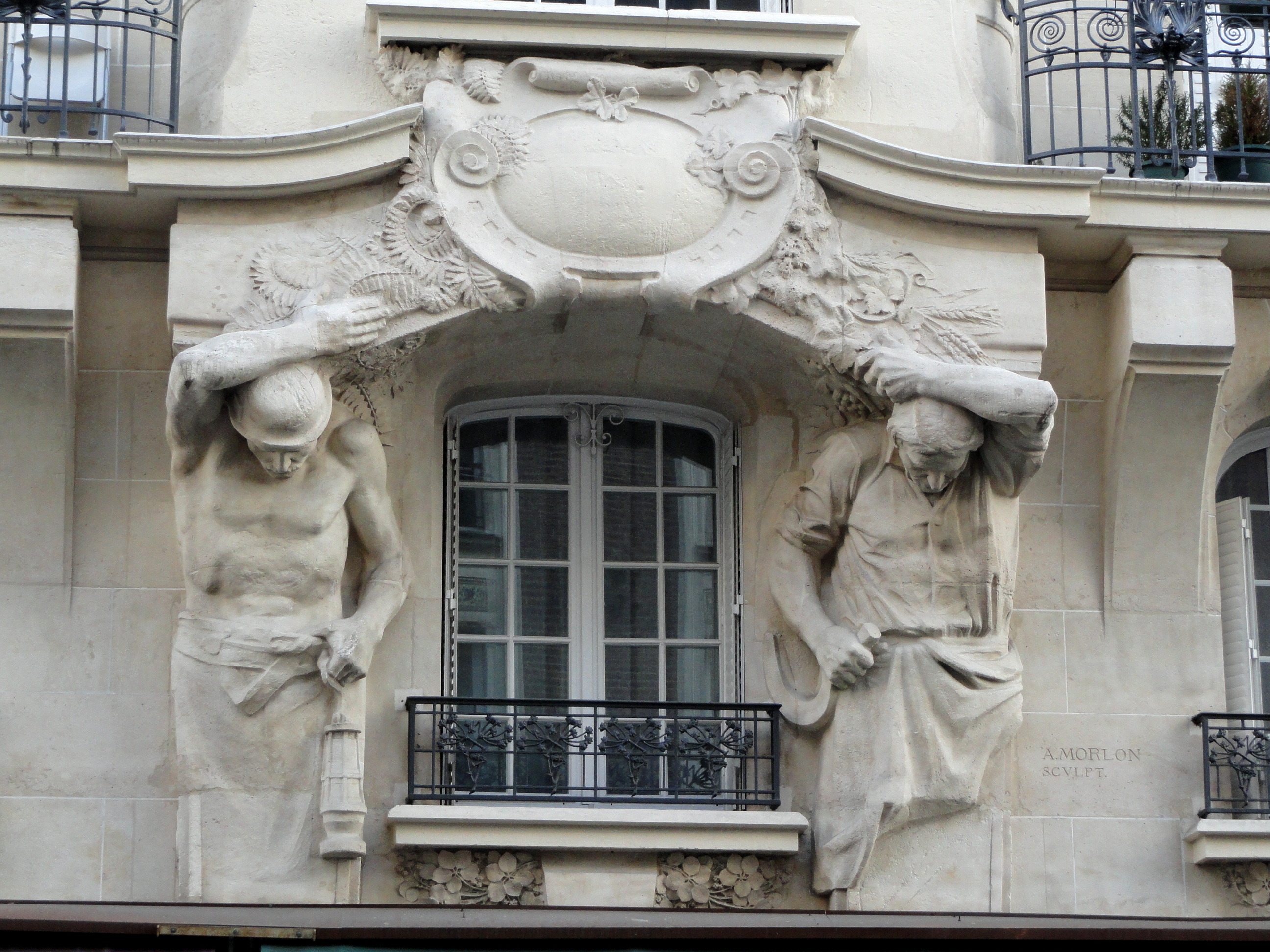
  - Détail: miner and farmer, 199-201 rue de Charenton, Raoul Brandon, 1911
    Joseph Charlet and F. Perrin, 24-26 rue Charles-Baudelaire, 12th
- 1911:
  - Raoul Brandon : 199-201 rue de Charenton, 12th
  - Théophile Leclerc, 2 rue Léon-Vaudoyer, 7th
  - Ernest Picard and Gustave Umbdenstock, 140 rue de la Tour, 16th
  - Feugneur, 31 avenue Félix Faure, 15th
  - Roger Bouvard, 2 rue de Buenos Aires, 7th
  - André Arfvidson, 31-31 bis rue Campagne-Première, 14th
- 1912:
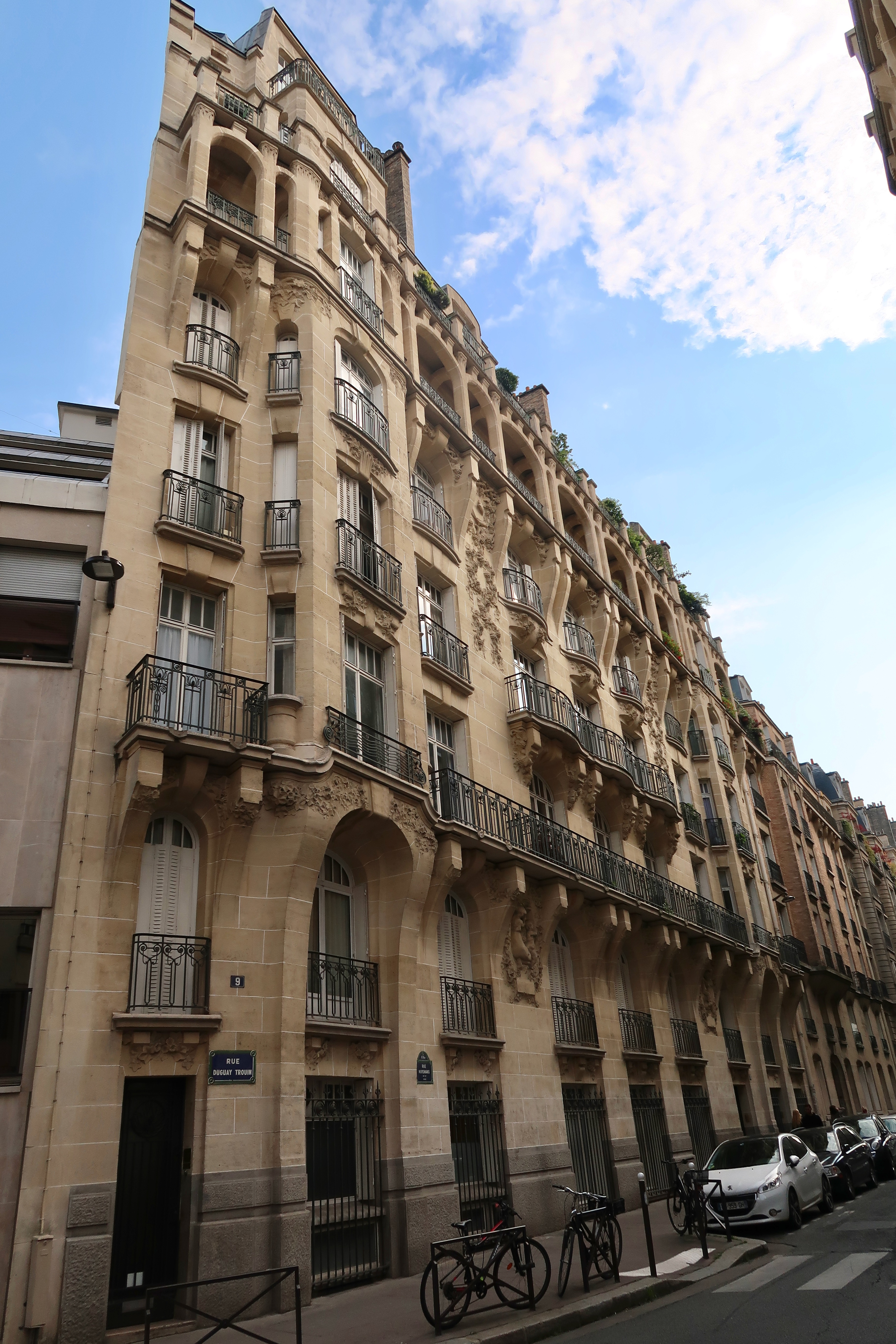
  Raoul Brandon, 1 rue Huysmans, 1922-23
  - Charles Labro, 19 boulevard Suchet, 16th
  - Eugène Chifflot, 149 boulevard Haussmann, 8th
  - Georges Guiard, 33 rue Daru and 55 boulevard de Courcelles, 8th
  - Mathieu Vimort, 3 avenue Élysée-Reclus, 7th
- 1913:
  - Émile Molinié, 7 rue Lebouis, 14th.
- 1922–123 :
  - Raoul Brandon, 1 rue Huysmans, 6th
- 1926:
  - Georges Albenque and Eugène Gonnot, Hameau du Danube, 46-48 Rue du Général-Brunet, 19th
  - Henri Sauvage, 137 boulevard Raspail, 6th
- 1928:
  - Hector Guimard, Guimard Building, 18 rue Henri-Heine, Paris 16th
- 1929:
  - Joseph Bassompierre, Emmanuel-Elisée Pontremoli, Paul de Rutté, Pierre Sirvin, 36 rue Antoine-Chantin and 47 rue des Plantes, 14th
- 1930:
  - Gabriel Brun, Hôtel Regina de Passy, 6 rue de la Tour, 16th

== See also ==
- French architecture
- Paris architecture of the Belle Époque
- Architecture of Paris
