= Richard Bouwens van der Boijen =

French architect (1863–1939)

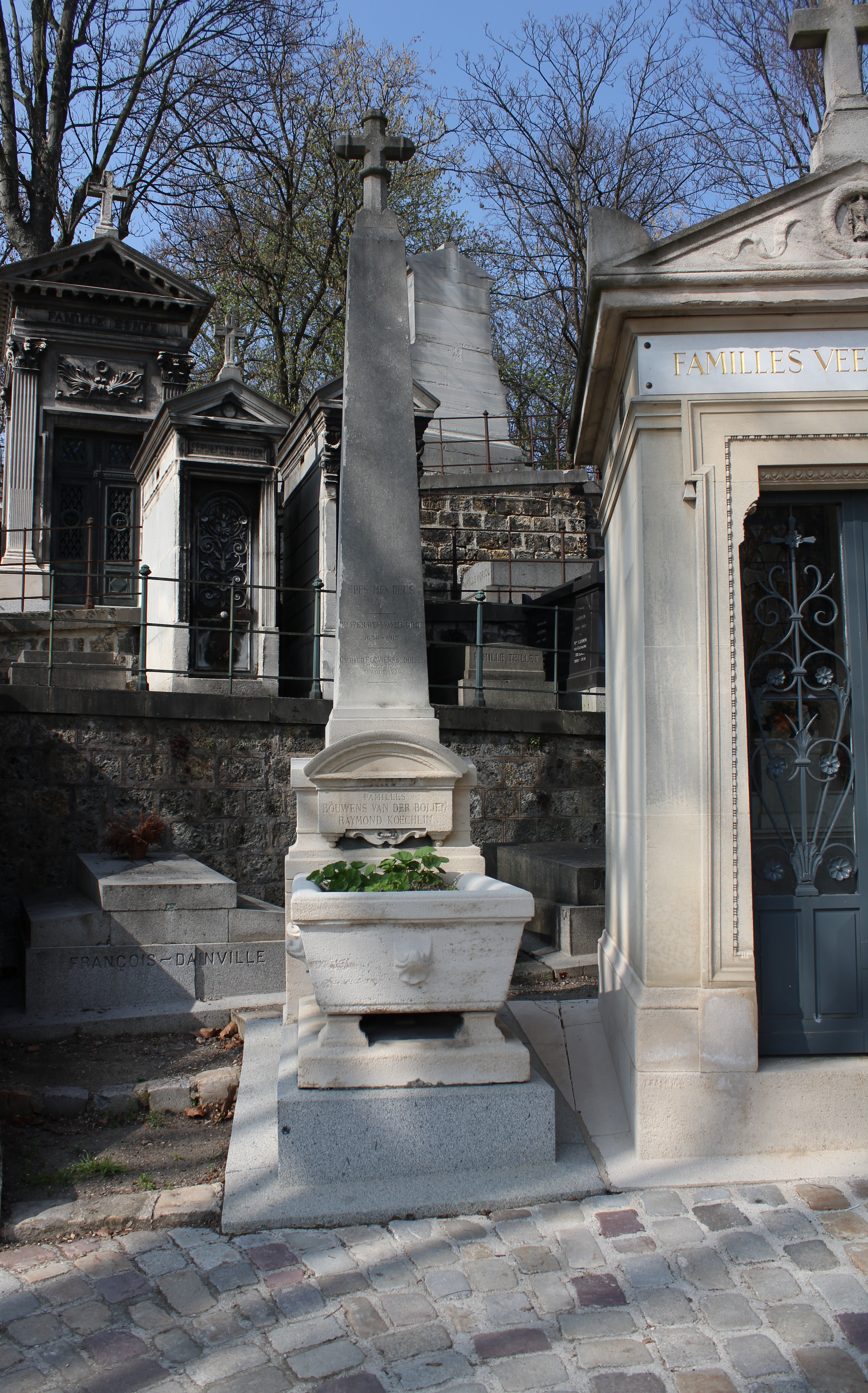
- Grave at Père-Lachaise cemetery.
- Born: 11 October 1863; Paris
- Died: 31 August 1939 (aged 75)
- Occupation: Architect

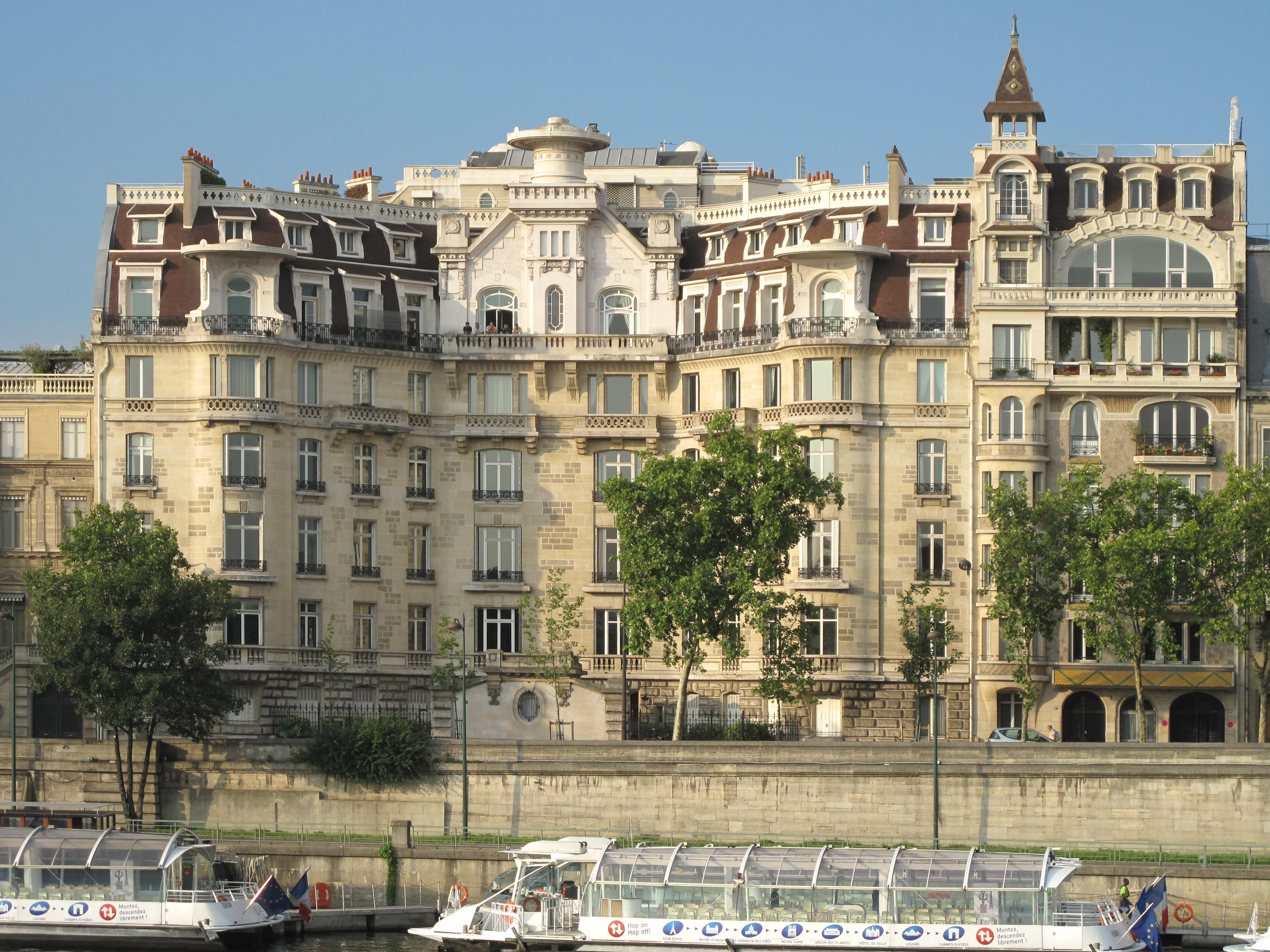
Quai Anatole France

Richard Hermann Antoine Bouwens van der Boijen (11 October 1863 – 31 August 1939) was a French architect. In 1901, he was one of the winners of the Concours de façades de la ville de Paris for the realization of an Hôtel particulier, 8, rue de Lota in the 16th arrondissement of Paris. In the 1930s, he was an exponent of the Art Deco style; with French architect Roger-Henri Expert, Bouwens was given overall responsibility for the interior design of the SS Normandie.

He is buried at Père-Lachaise Cemetery (36th division).

== Some creations ==
- 1905: 27 bis quai Anatole-France (Paris)
- 1905: 27 quai Anatole-France (Paris)
- 1902: Le Centorial (Paris)
- 1899: Hôtel particulier, 8, rue de Lota (16th)
- Hôtel particulier, 6, rue de Chézy (Neuilly-sur-Seine)
- Hôtel particulier, 8, rue de Chézy (Neuilly-sur-Seine)
- Paquebot Ile-de-France, créateur de la grande descente de la salle à manger

== Bibliography ==
- « Archives d'architecture du XXe siècle, Volume 1 », 1991
- Hélène Guéné, « Décoration et haute couture : Armand Albert Rateau pour Jeanne Lanvin, un autre Art déco », 2006
- François Roux, « Les architectes élèves de l'Ecole des beaux-arts : 1783-1907 », 2007
