= Jules Lavirotte =

French architect (1864-1929)

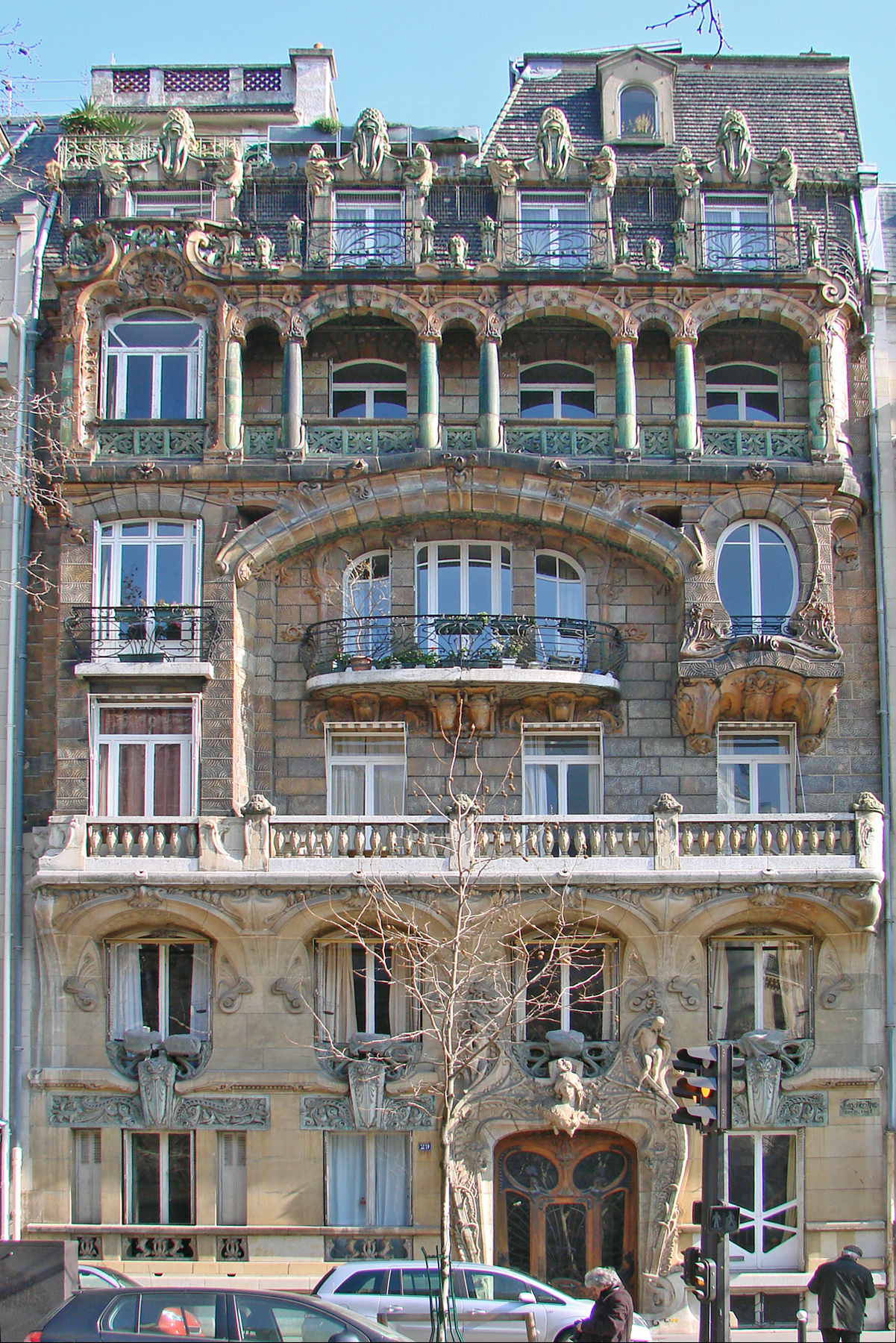
Lavirotte Building at 29 Avenue Rapp, 7th arrondissement (1901)

Jules Aimé Lavirotte (March 25, 1864 in Lyon – March 1, 1929 in Paris) was a French architect who is best known for the Art Nouveau buildings he created in the 7th arrondissement in Paris. His buildings were known for his imaginative and exuberant decoration, and particularly for his use of sculpture and glazed ceramic tiles on the facades, made in collaboration with leading sculptors and the ceramic manufacturer Alexandre Bigot. He was three times awarded prizes by the city of Paris for the most original facades, for the Lavirotte Building at 29 Avenue Rapp (1901), for the Ceramic hotel, 34 Avenue de Wagram (1904), and for the building at 23 avenue de Messine (8th arrondissement) in 1907.

== Biography ==
Lavirotte was born in Lyon, and went on to study at the Ecole des Beaux-Arts in Lyon, where he was a pupil of Antoine Georges Louvier (1818–92). He subsequently studied at the Ecole des Beaux-Arts in Paris under the tutelage of Paul Blondel (1847–97), and gained his architect's diploma there in 1894.

The first five buildings built by Lavirotte were all in the same part of Paris, the 7th arrondissement. Three were in close proximity to each other, at 3 Square Rapp, 29 Avenue Rapp, and 12 Rue Sedillot. The first two buildings benefited from Lavirotte's collaboration with Alexandre Bigot, a chemistry professor who imported the technology of making glazed earthenware tiles, which he had seen at the 1889 Paris Exposition. His firm provided the exterior decoration for Lavirotte's most famous buildings, as well as for works by the other prominent art nouveau architects, Three of his buildings were awarded prizes in the Paris facade competition, which gave prizes to several buildings each year; The Lavirotte Building (1901), at 29 Avenue Rapp, his most flamboyant and famous work, known for its extravagant sculpted portal; The Ceramic Hotel, 34 Avenue de Wagram, 8th arrondissement (1904), which also featured ceramic decoration by Bigot; and the building at 23 avenue de Messine in the 8th arrondissement (1906-1907). His last two major Paris buildings, next to each other at 23 Avenue de Messine and 6 rue de Messine, were in a more subdued style, with less flamboyant decoration, but with refined craftsmanship and sculptural ornament. They were his last art nouveau works.

In 1904, he traveled to Tunisia, where he designed a villa and a chateau and restored a church in the town of Chaouat. In 1906, he built an experiment in low-cost housing, a bungalow at 169 Boulevard Lefebvre in 15th arrondissement (no longer existing). In 1907, he designed the villa Dupont, located at 2 rue Balzac in Franconville, Val-d'Oise, in the Paris suburbs.

He died in 1929, and his work was largely ignored until the 1960s, when art nouveau was rediscovered. His major works were declared historic landmarks, and he was recognized, along with Hector Guimard and Henri Sauvage. as one of the major figures of the Paris art nouveau,

== Notable works (1898-1899) ==
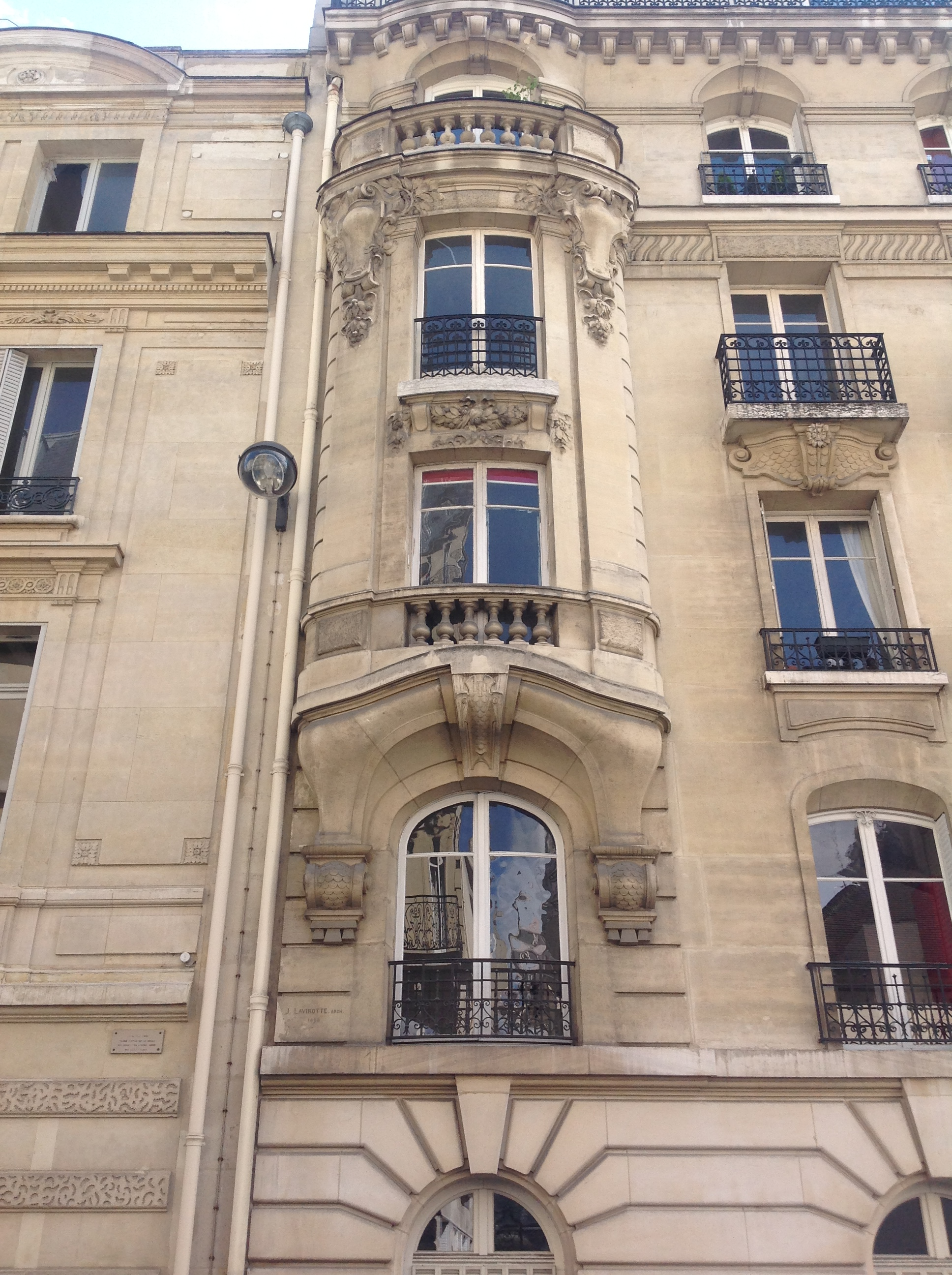
Facade of 151 rue de Grenelle (1898)

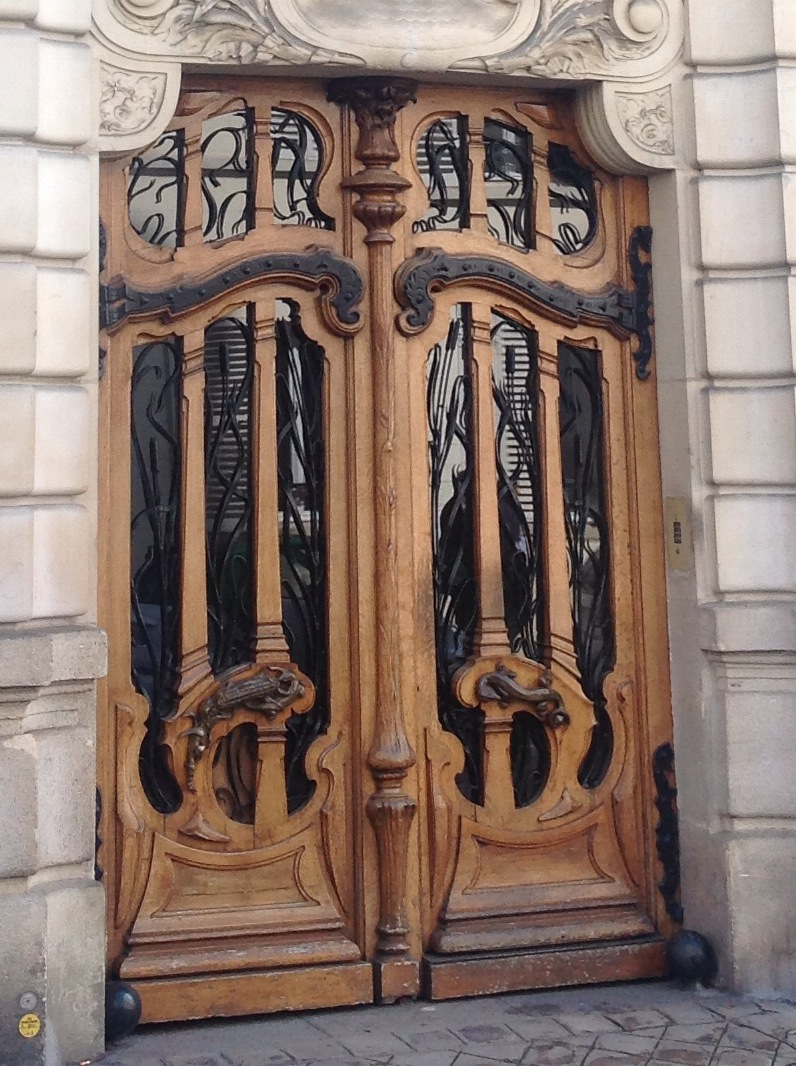
Doorway of the building at 151 rue de Grenelle (1898)

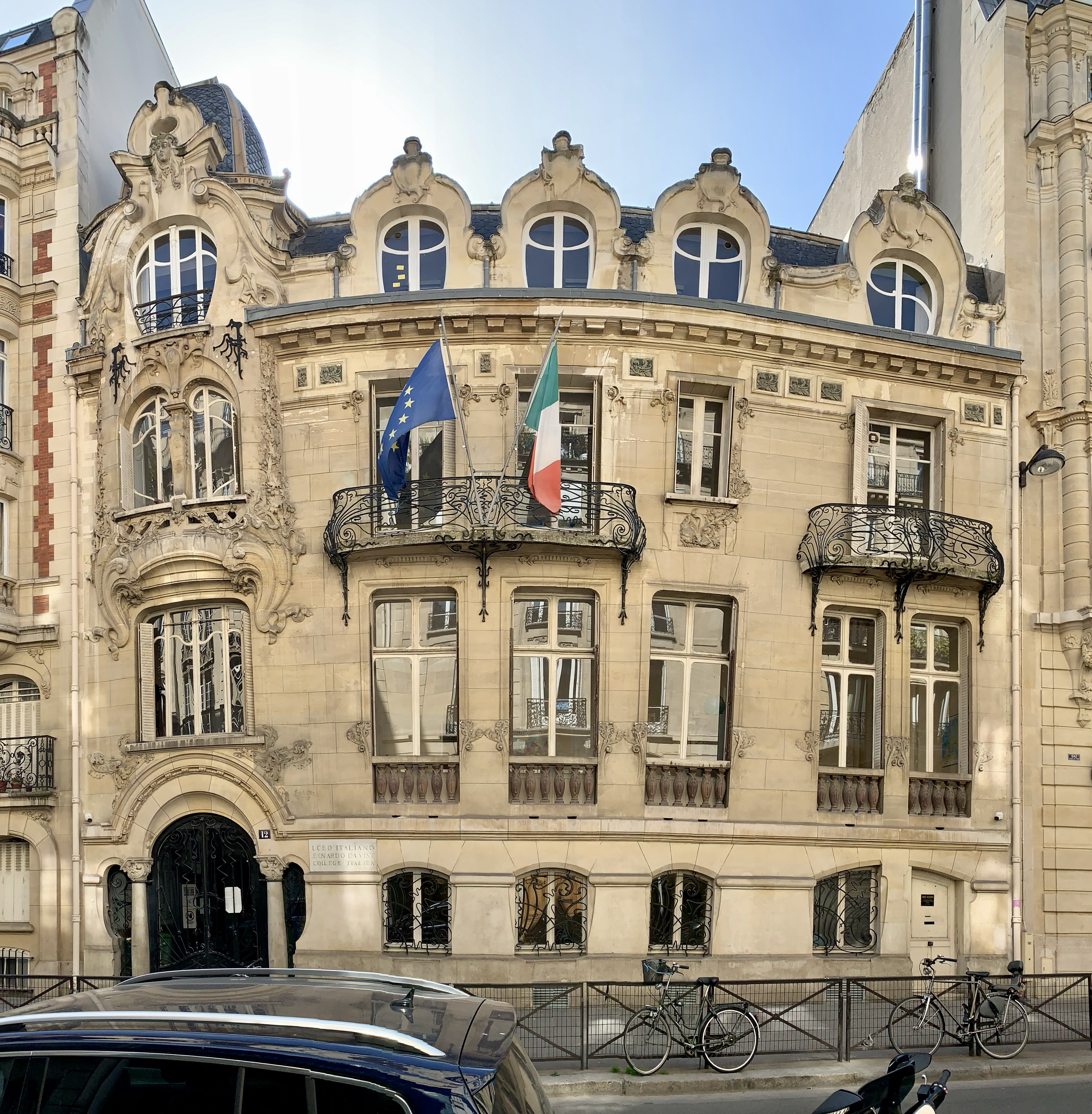
The Istituto Statale Italiano Leonardo Da Vinci head office and secondary school (Lycée Italien) at 12 rue Sedillot (1899)

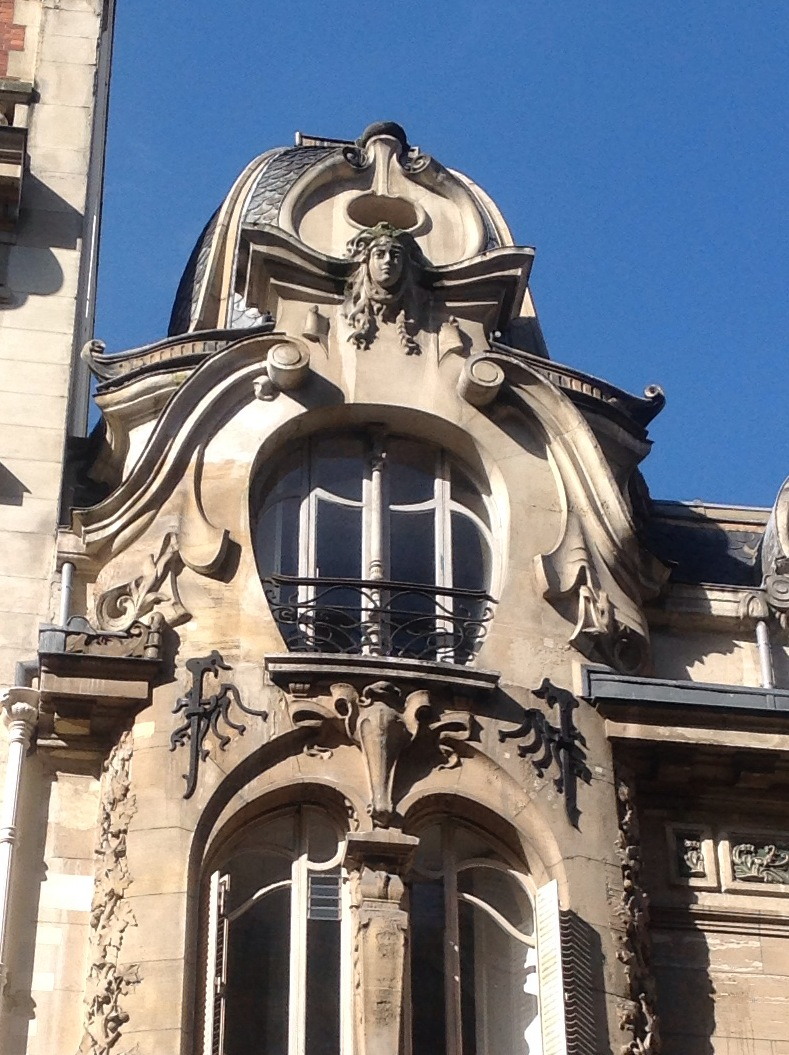
Detail of the Lycée Italien, rue Sedillot (1899)

=== 151 Rue de Grenelle, 7th arrondissement (1898) ===
The first major building designed by Lavirotte. Its facade—influenced by the French Rococo style—offers only hints of the theatrical displays for which Lavirotte was to become known.

=== 12 Rue Sedillot, 7th arrondissement (1899) ===
This building is very close to two other notable Lavirotte buildings, at 3 Square Rapp and 29 Avenue Rapp. The building was originally commissioned by the Comtesse de Montessuy as her residence, and is sometimes called the Hôtel Montessuy. It was completed in 1899. It became the headquarters of a political party in the 1930s, and then a school, the Lycée Italien Leonardo-de-Vinci. While the style of the facade is largely Louis XV, it also includes a display of the imaginative details and exuberant decoration that characterize the work of Lavirotte. The use of a railing with ceramic columns on the first floor balcony was repeated by Lavirotte at 3 Square Rapp and 29 Avenue Rapp. The interior was extensively modified when the residence was made into a school. The winding stairway, with an art nouveau wrought iron railing, is one of the few original features that survived. The courtyard behind the house was made into a gymnasium; the former rear exterior wall of the house is now an interior wall of that room.

== Notable works (1900-1901) ==
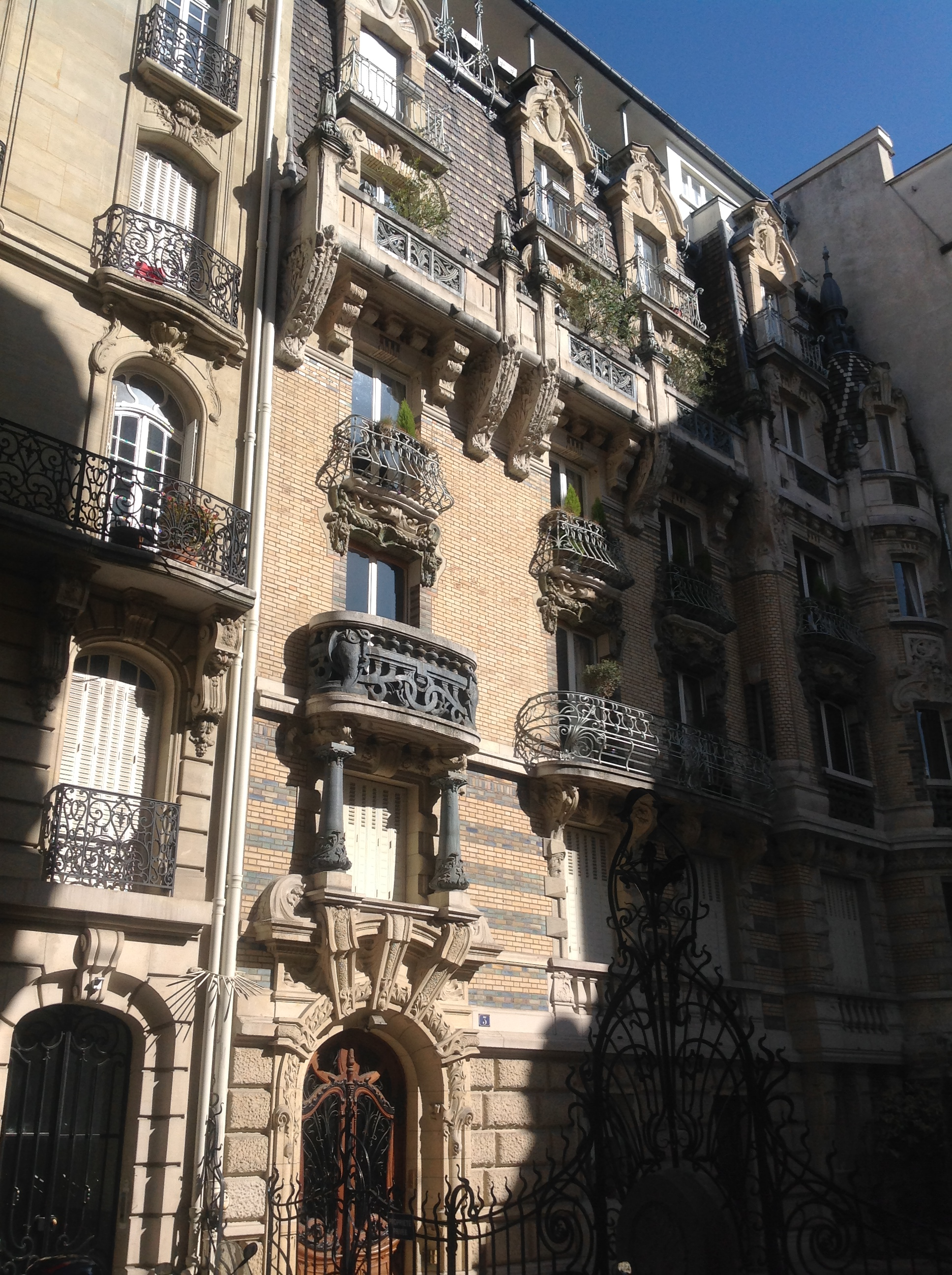
Facade of 3 square Rapp (7th arrondissement) (1899-1900)

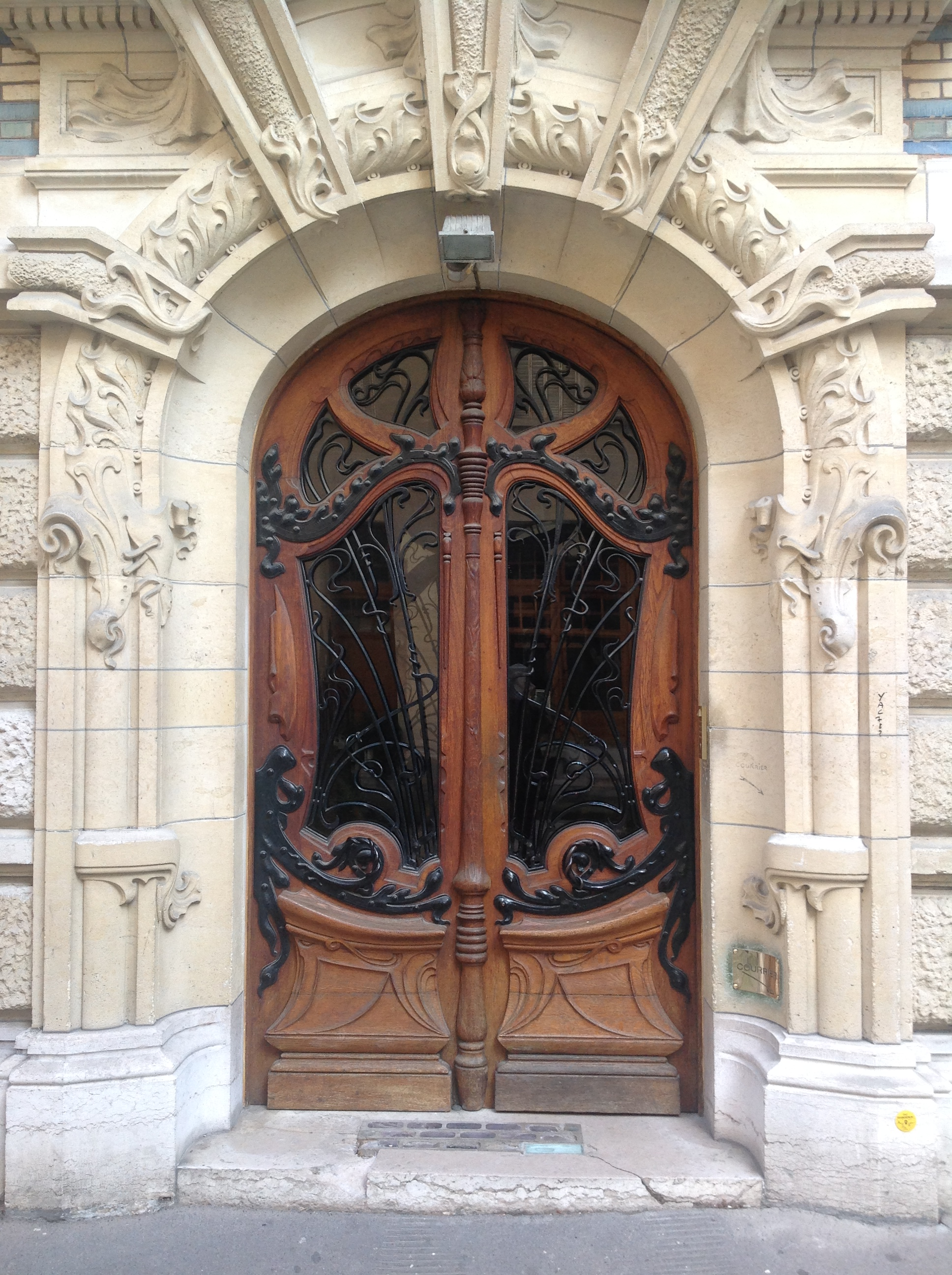
Doorway of 3 Square Rapp (1899-1900)

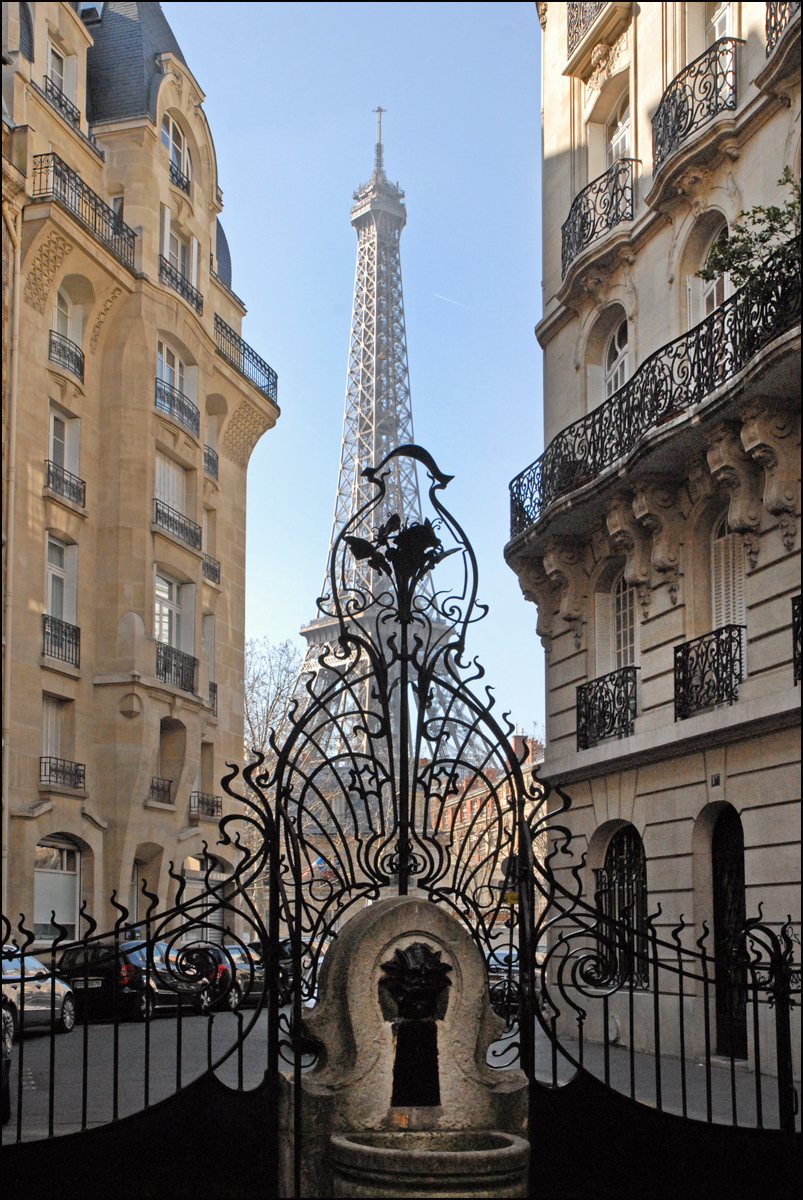
Exterior grill and fountain of 3 Square Rapp, with Eiffel Tower behind

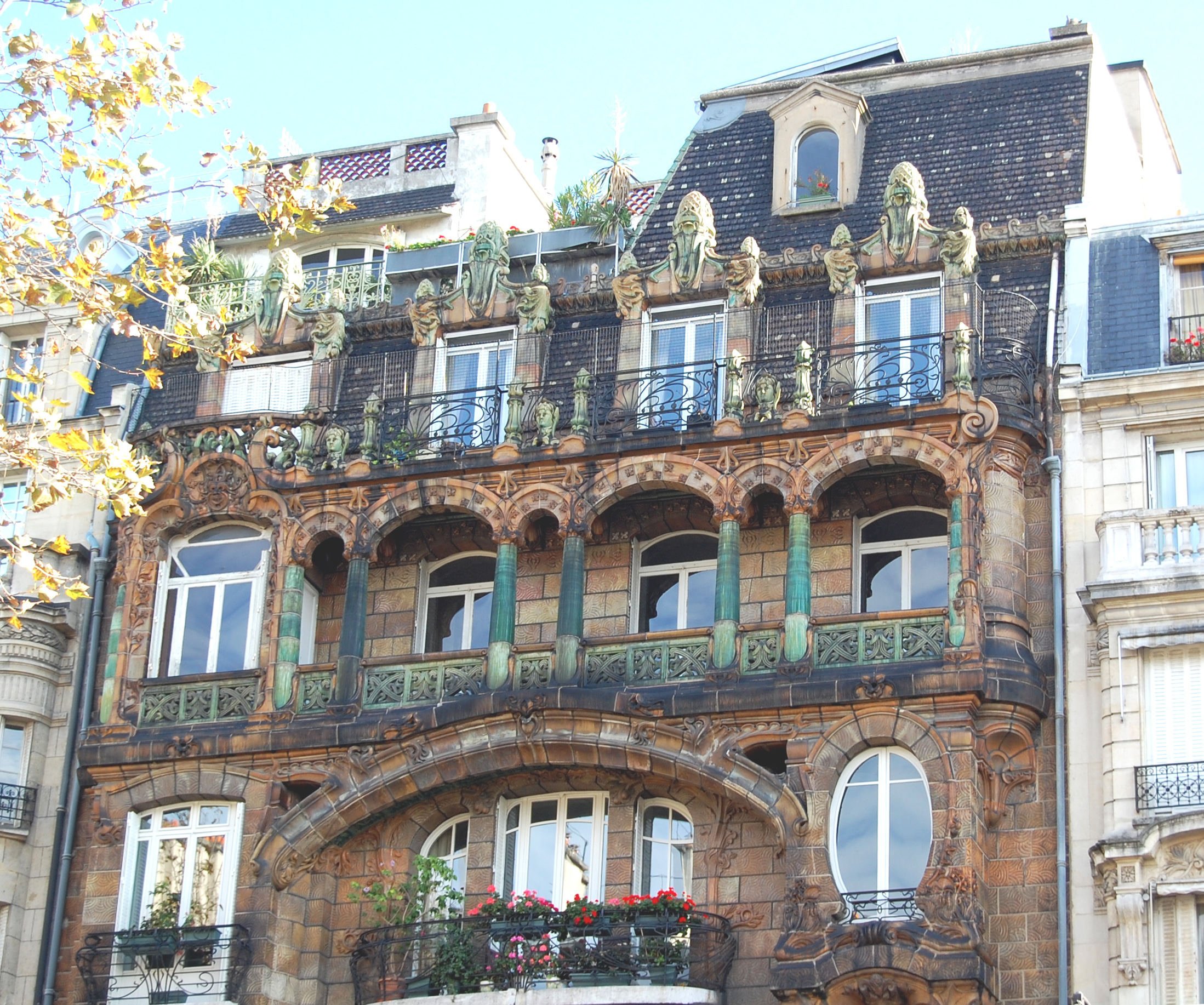
Upper floors of the Lavirotte Building (1901)

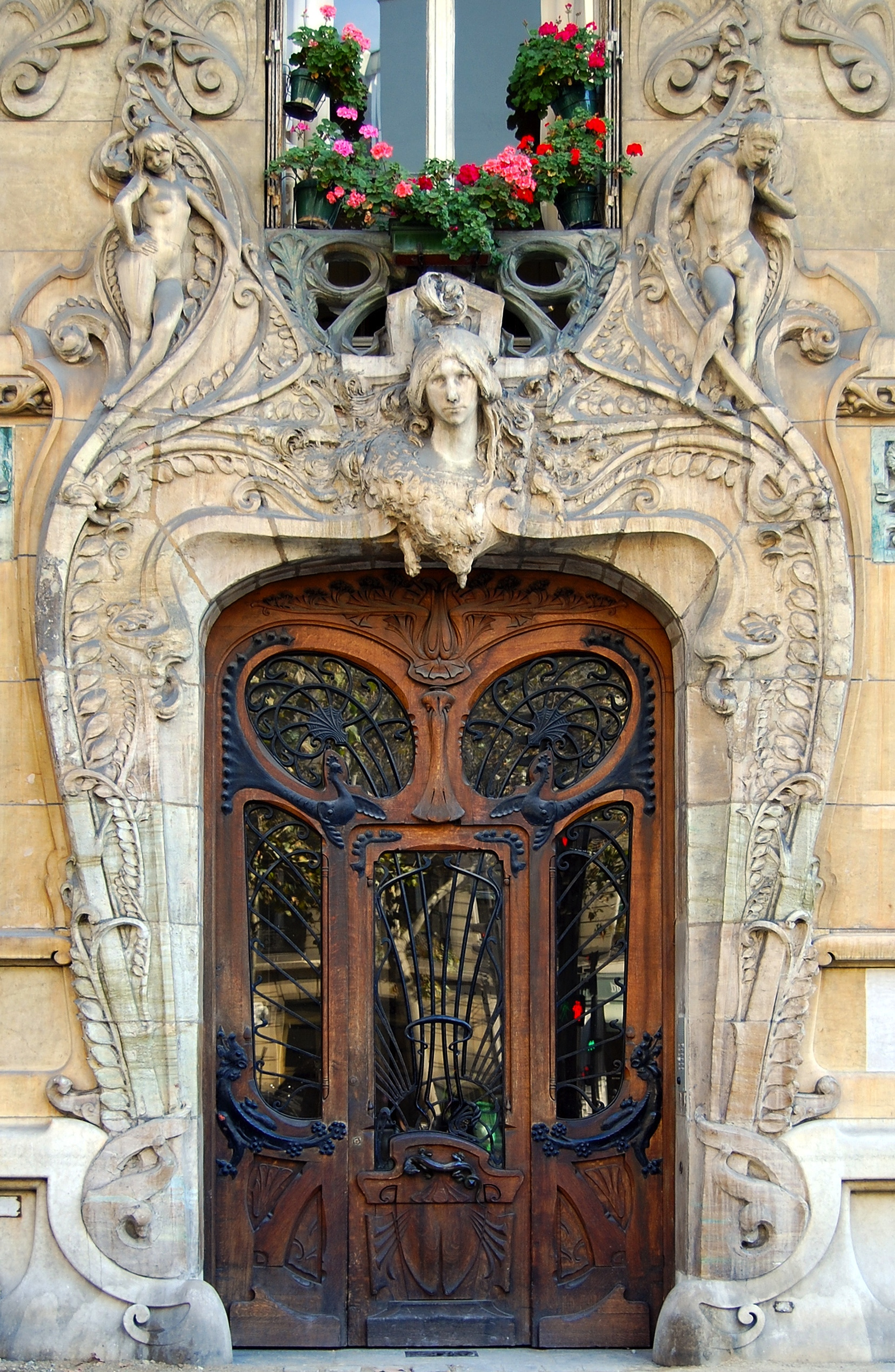
Entry to the Lavirotte Building (1901)

=== 3 Square Rapp, 7th arrondissement (1899-1900) ===
This apartment building, on a small square just around the corner from the Lavirotte Building on Avenue Rapp, was the residence of Lavirotte, who had an apartment on the fifth floor. It featured many of the art nouveau features of his later buildings, including a very ornate doorway and whimsical borrowings from earlier architectural periods, and also made extensive use of the decorative ceramic tiles of Alexanadre Bigot on the upper floors of the facade. The ornamental tower on the corner rests on column. The building is separated from the street by an ornamental grill and small fountain by Lavirotte, which frames a remarkable view of the Eiffel Tower.

=== 29 Avenue Rapp, 7th arrondissement (1901) ===
The deployment of glazed earthenware on the facade of the Lavirotte Building in 1901 was the first example of its kind in the West. Glazed tiles embedded in the stone and in the bricks are the work of ceramicist Alexandre Bigot; the building proved to be an effective advertisement for his wares. It was adorned even by the standards of other ceramically finished facades that were built in the following years, which were appointed this way because this was a way to protect and beautify the iron and concrete materials whose use was fast becoming the standard. The building at 29 avenue Rapp also had an exotic door frame designed by the sculptor Jean-Baptiste Larrive, and sculpted by Messrs Théobald-Joseph Sporrer, Firmin-Marcelin Michelet, and Alfred Jean Halou.

== Later buildings (1904-1907) ==
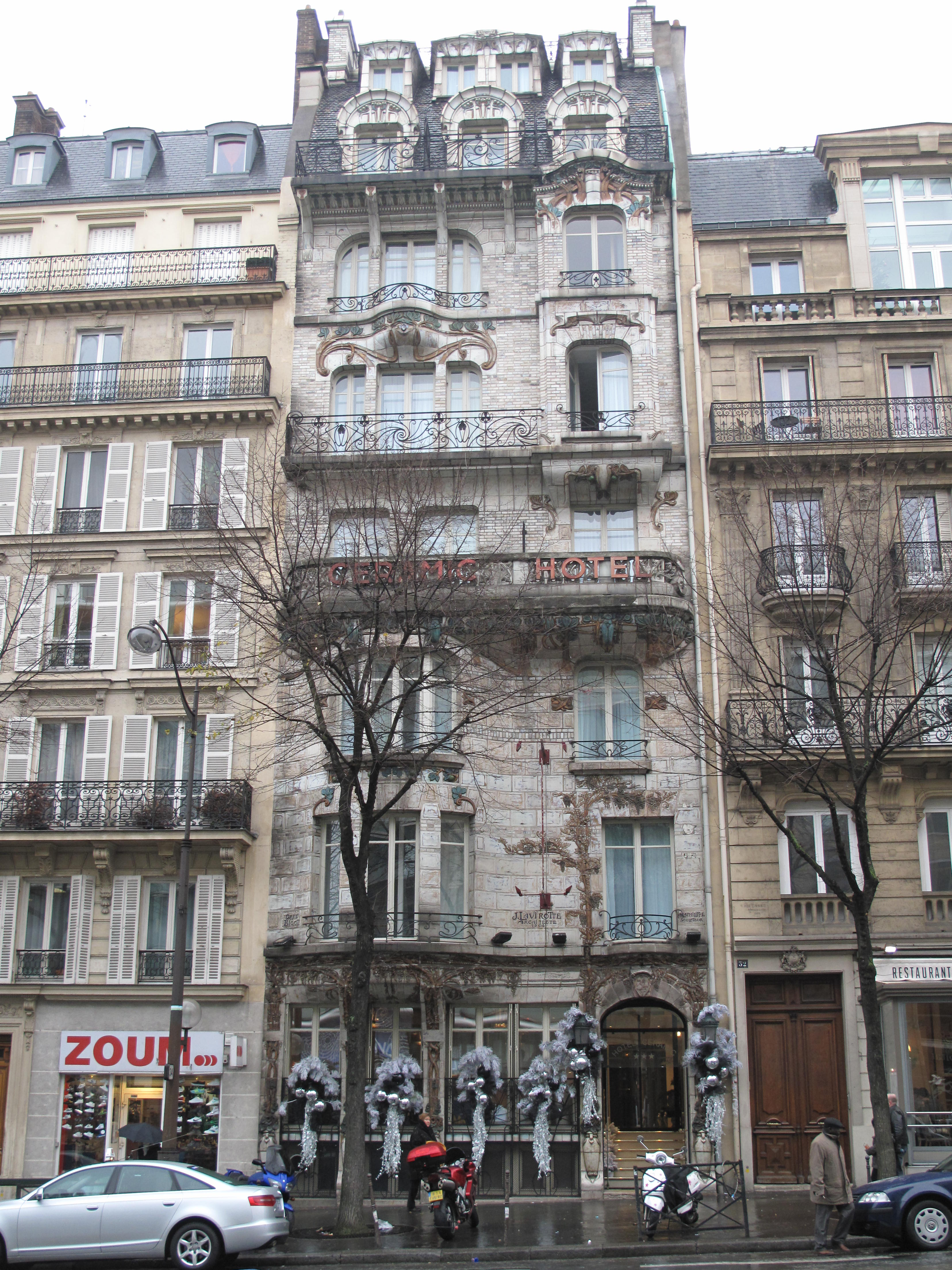
Ceramic Hotel (1904)

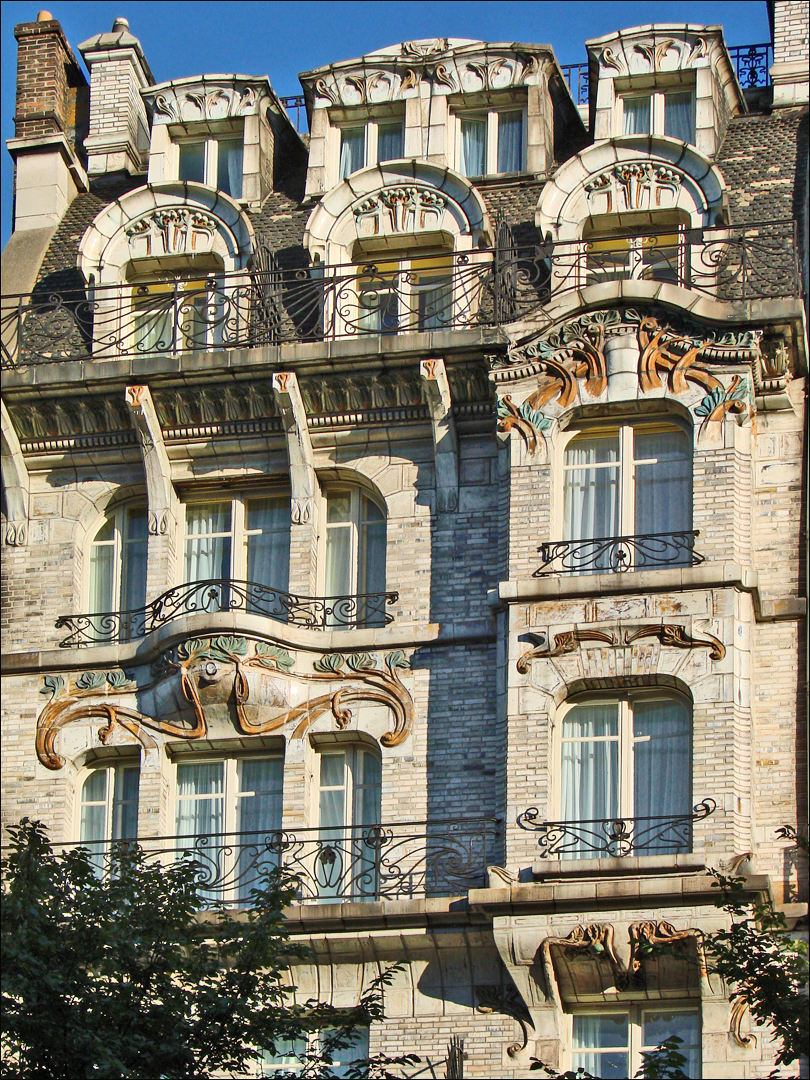
Ceramic Hotel upper facade decoration

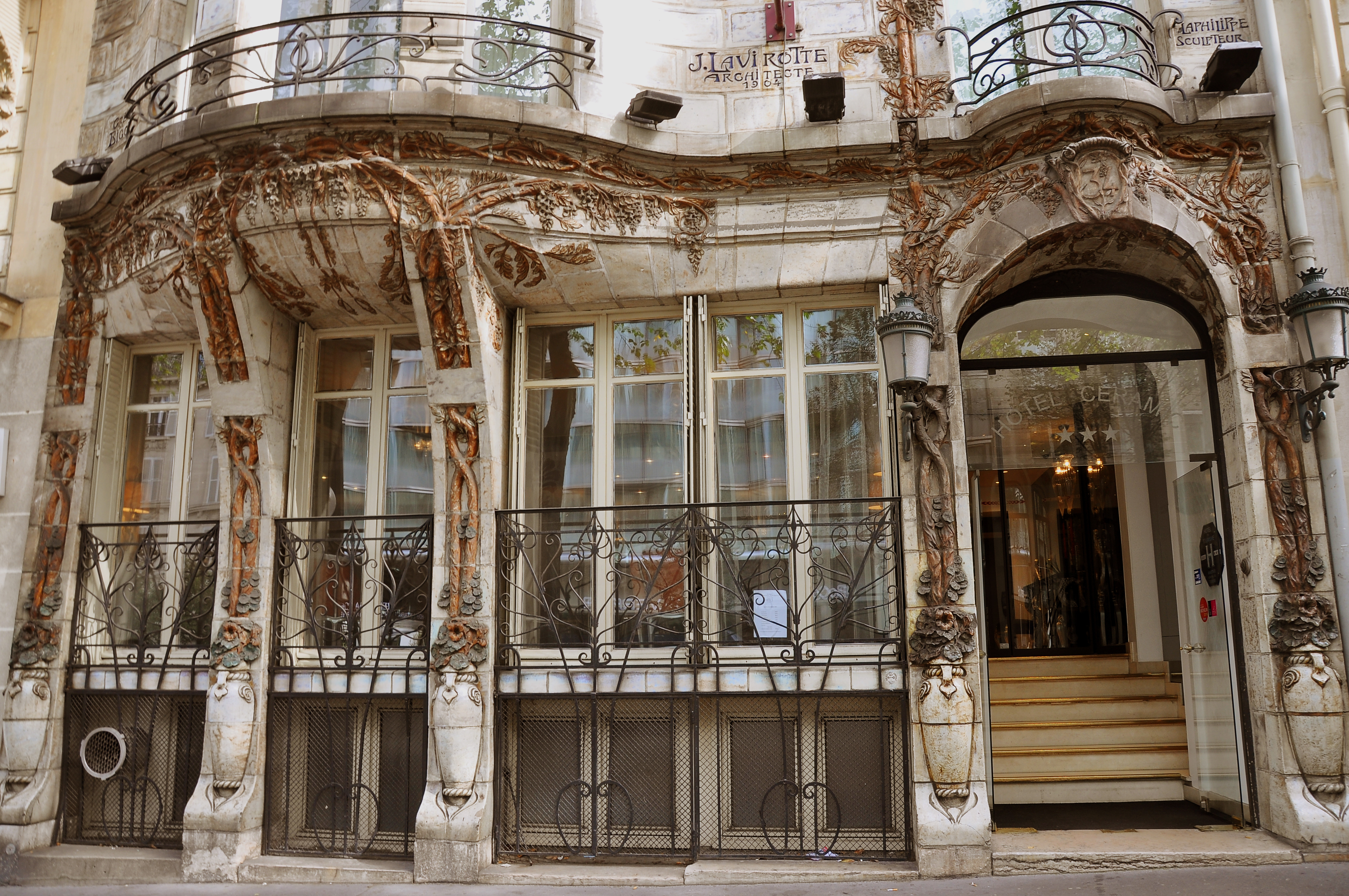
Ground floor of the Ceramic Hotel

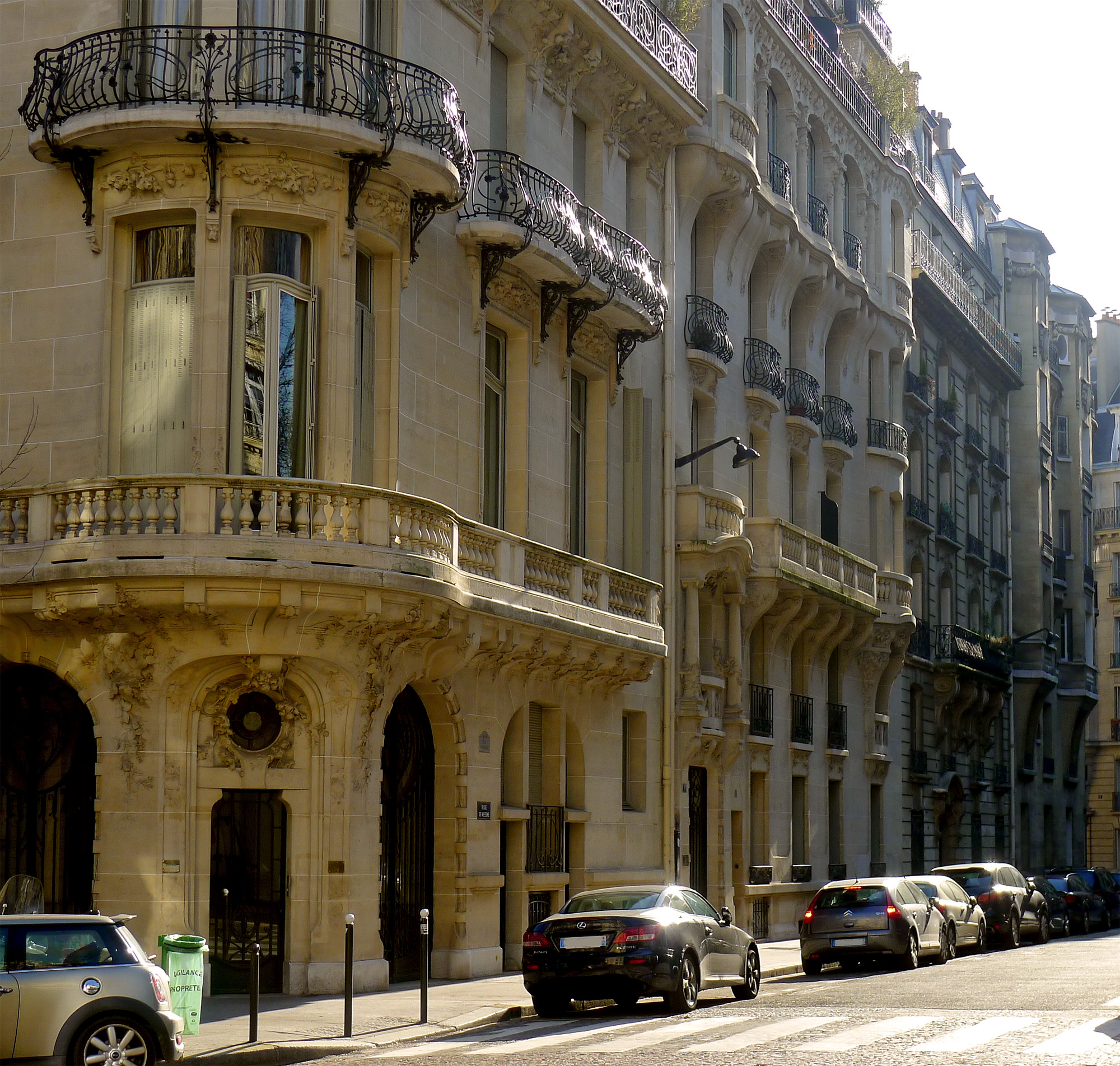
23 Avenue Messine (left) and 6 rue Massine (right) show the more subdued style of Lavirotte's later buildings (1906–07)

=== Ceramic Hotel, 34 avenue de Wagram (8th arrondissement) (1904) ===
The Ceramic Hotel, located at 34 avenue de Wagram in the 8th arrondissement, was built in 1904. It was constructed of reinforced concrete, and the ceramic decoration on the facade was made by the firm of Alexandre Bigot. The sculptural decoration of climbing plants on the exterior of the first floor is signed by the sculptor Camille Alaphilippe, a winner of the Prix de Rome given by the Academy of Fine Arts. The building was a winner of the city competition for best facade in 1905. It originally was a maison meublée, a furnished house or an establishment which rented furnished rooms. It later became a hotel, the Elysée-Ceramic Hôtel, and still later took its current name. Almost all of the original interior decoration disappeared when it became a hotel, but a few of the original details, including a stairway and a stained glass window in the stairway, remain. It was listed as an historic monument in 1964.

=== Number 6 Rue de Messine and number 23 Avenue de Messine (8th arrondissement) (1906-1907) ===
The two buildings on Avenue and rue Messine are next to each other, were built at about the same time, and followed a very similar design. Number 23, on the corner of avenue de Messine and rue Messine, was a hôtel particulaire, a private residence, and was originally just three stories high. The four upper floors and small tower were added later. Number 23 was a winner in the 1907 facade competition. The style of both buildings was more subdued than his earlier buildings, but both still featured a lavish use of sculpted ceramic tiles, wrought iron balconies, and floral sculpture above the entrance on the rounded corner number 23. The sculpture on both buildings was the work of Léon Binet.

== List of buildings ==
- 151 Rue de Grenelle, 7th arrondissement (1898)
- 12 Rue Sedillot, 7th arrondissement (1899)
- 3 Square Rapp, 7th arrondissement (1899)
- 134 Rue de Grenelle, 7th arrondissement (1900)
- 29 Avenue Rapp, 7th arrondissement (1901)
- Chateau at Chaouat (Tunisia, c.1904)
- Villa at Chaouat (Tunisia, c.1904)
- Restoration of the Church at Chaouat (Tunisia, c.1904)
- Ceramic hotel, 34 Avenue de Wagram, 8th arrondissement (1904)
- 169 Boulevard Lefebvre, 15th arrondissement (1906)
- 23 Avenue de Messine, 8th arrondissement (1906, top floors added later, doing away with Lavirotte's garden roof)
- 6 Rue de Messine, 8th arrondissement (1907)
- 2 Rue Balzac, Franconville, Val d’Oise (c. 1907)

== See also ==
- Paris architecture of the Belle Époque
- Architecture of Paris
- Art Nouveau
- Concours de façades de la ville de Paris of which he was thrice one the winners (1901, 1905, 1907)
