= Lavirotte Building =

Apartment building in Paris

Coordinates: 48°51′33″N 2°18′03″E

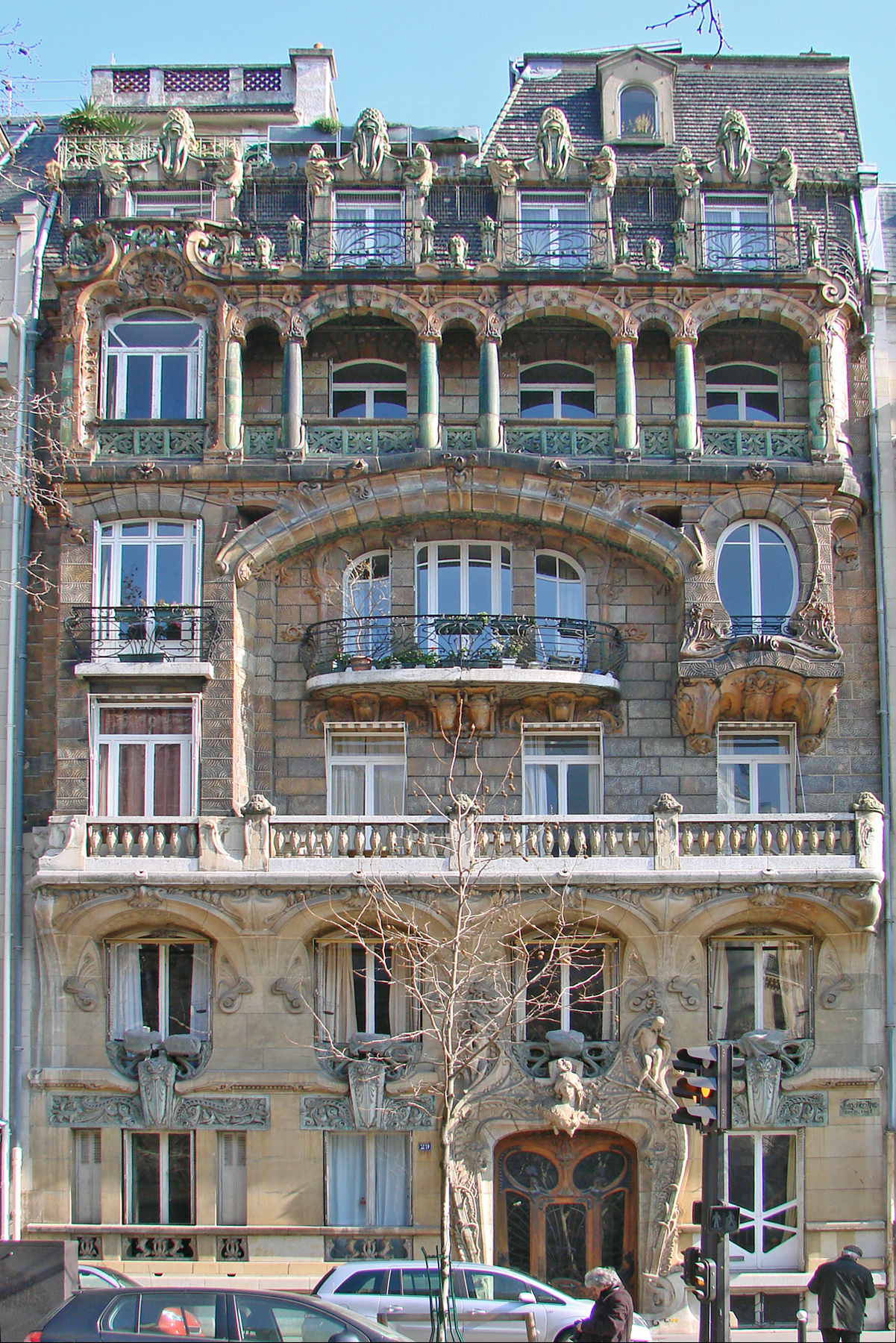
Lavirotte Building (1901)

The Lavirotte Building, an apartment building at 29 Avenue Rapp in the 7th arrondissement of Paris, France, was designed by the architect Jules Lavirotte and built between 1899 and 1901. The building is one of the best-known surviving examples of Art Nouveau architecture in Paris. The facade is lavishly decorated with sculpture and ceramic tiles made by the ceramics manufacturer Alexandre Bigot. Lavirotte was awarded the prize for the most original new facade in the 7th arrondissement in 1901.

== History ==
The architect, Jules Lavirotte, had already built two buildings in the same neighborhood of the 7th arrondissement; a private residence at 12 Rue Sédillot (now a school) and an apartment building at 3 Square Rapp, where he had his own apartment on the fifth floor. Both of these buildings had some of the fantasy and art nouveau elements for which Lavirotte was famous, but none were as exuberant as the new building. Some sources, including the Base Mérimée, the official list of French historic monuments, state that the building was owned by Alexandre Bigot, a chemistry professor turned entrepreneur who was the first in France to manufacture glazed ceramic tiles, an ancient technique he borrowed from China. However, the construction permit shows the building was owned by Lavirotte and Charles Combes, and there is no evidence that Bigot ever lived there. Nonetheless, the building did become a very effective showcase of the glazed earthenware tiles that he developed, which were later used in other notable Art Nouveau buildings. The ceramic tiles and sculpture turned the building into a work of art, a large piece of sculpture.

Lavirotte used several innovations in the construction of the building. Some of the walls were built with an early form of reinforced concrete. The bricks were hollow; once they had been put in place, metal wires or rods were run through them to secure them and then they were filled with concrete. In addition, Lavirotte built the walls in two layers with an air space between, to provide more effective soundproofing.

A team of craftsmen was responsible for the construction and decoration; The ironwork was made by Dondelinger; the sculptural decoration, designed by Lavirotte, was done by Théobald-Joseph Sporrer, Firmin Michelet and Alfred-Jean Halou. The sculpture around the front doorway was by Jean-Baptiste Larrivé.

The Lavirotte building was listed as an historic monument in 1964.

== 1901 facade competition ==
Like his contemporary, Hector Guimard, Lavirotte was catapulted to fame when the building was a winner in the Paris competition of new facades of 1901 (the Concours de façades de la ville de Paris). The competition had been created to encourage Paris architects to break away from the model for apartment buildings created by Georges-Eugène Haussmann during the reign of Napoléon III, which later critics found monotonous. In giving the award to Lavirotte, the jury declared, "the ensemble of the facade, which produces a very agreeable effect, certainly contributes to the decoration of the grand boulevard on which it is constructed. Lavirotte won the prize two more times, for the Ceramic Hotel in 1905.

== Facade ==
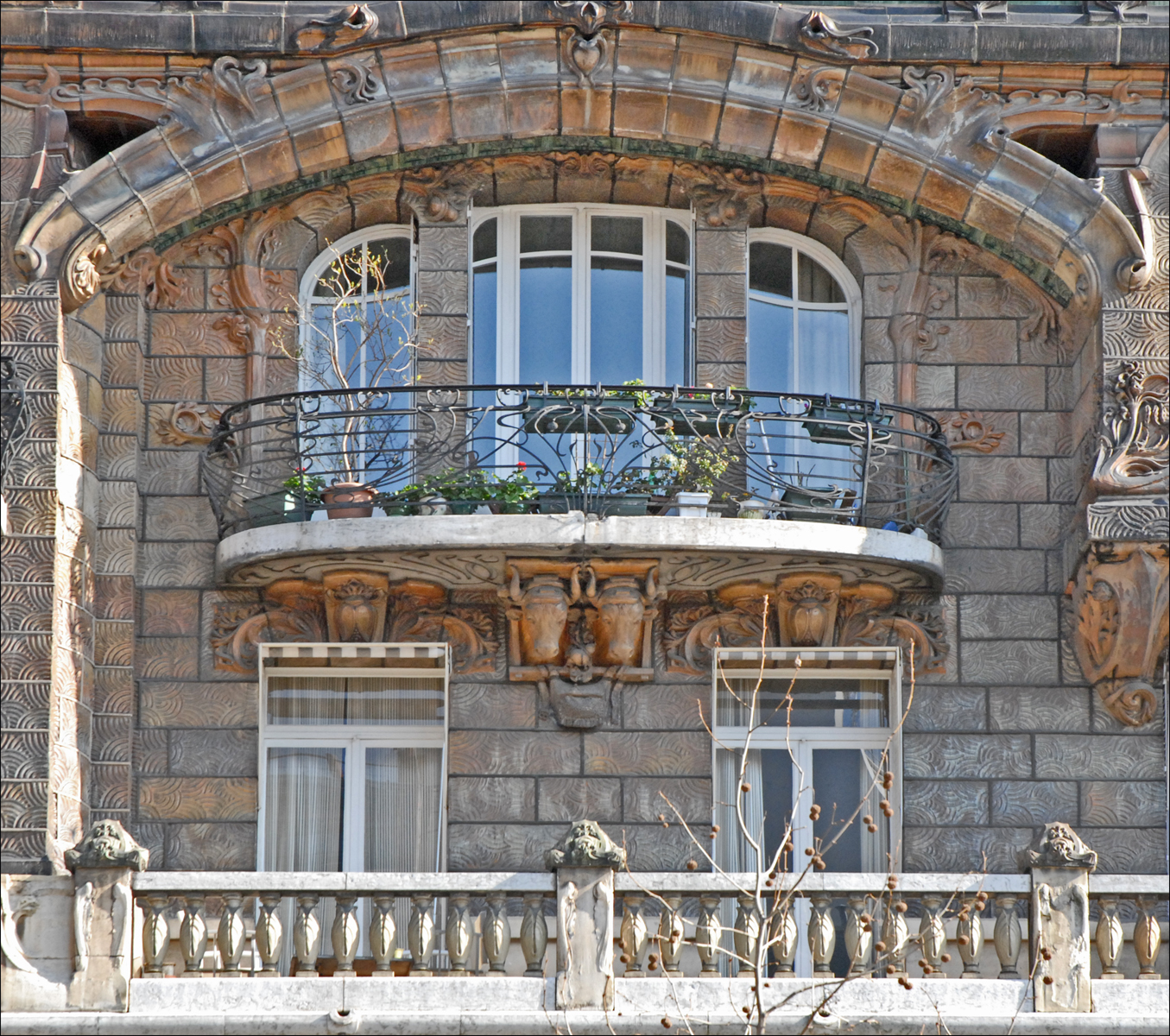

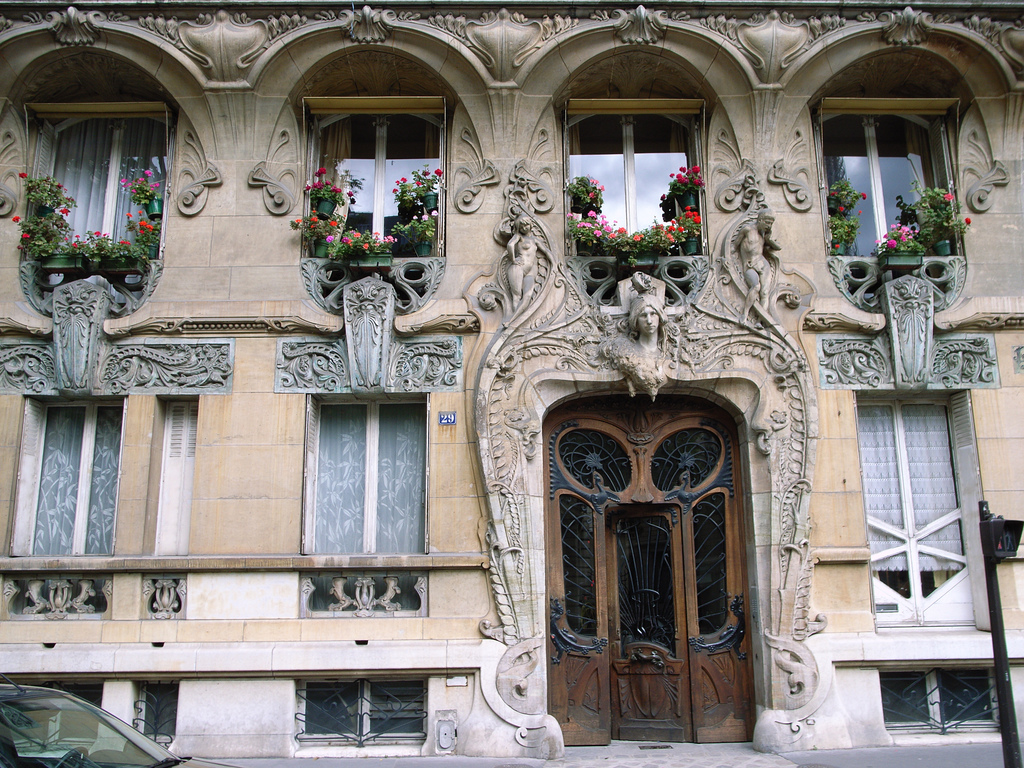

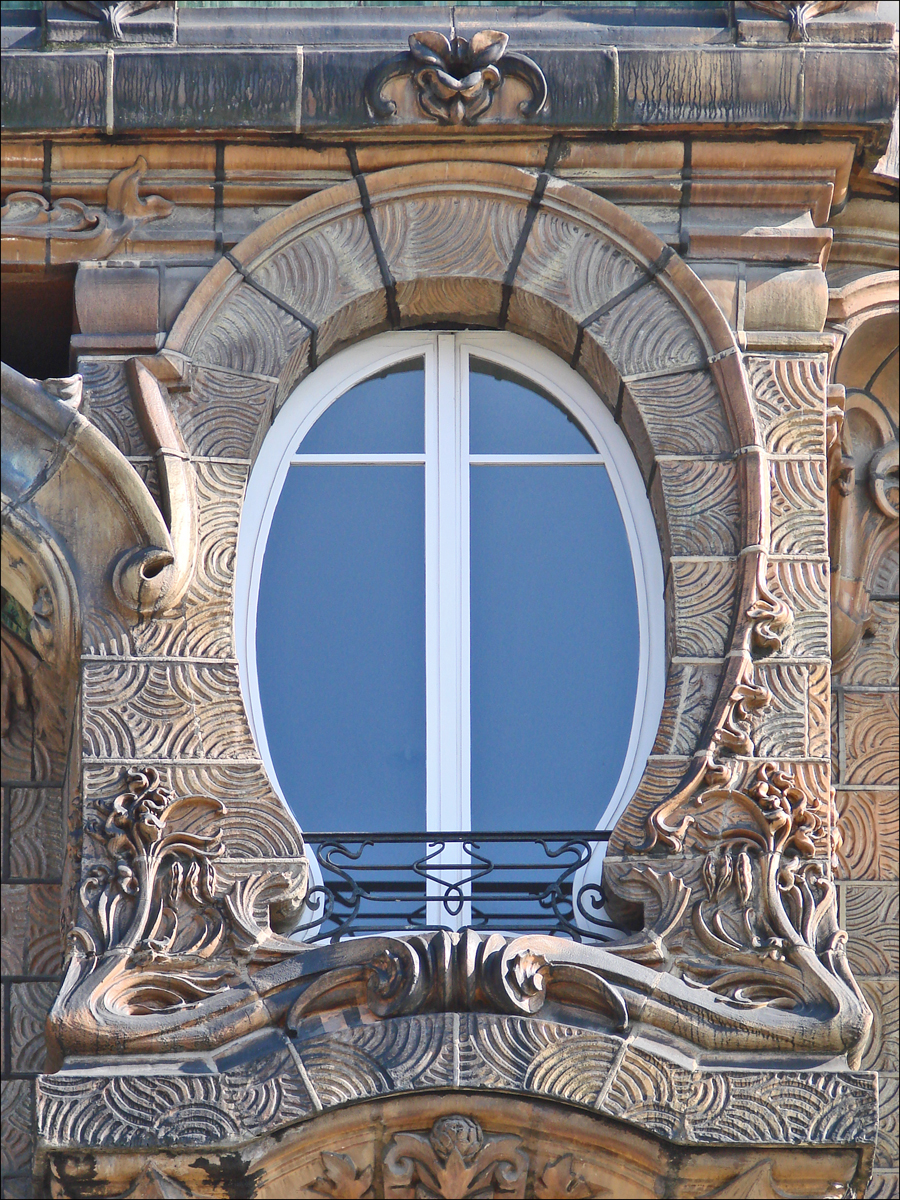

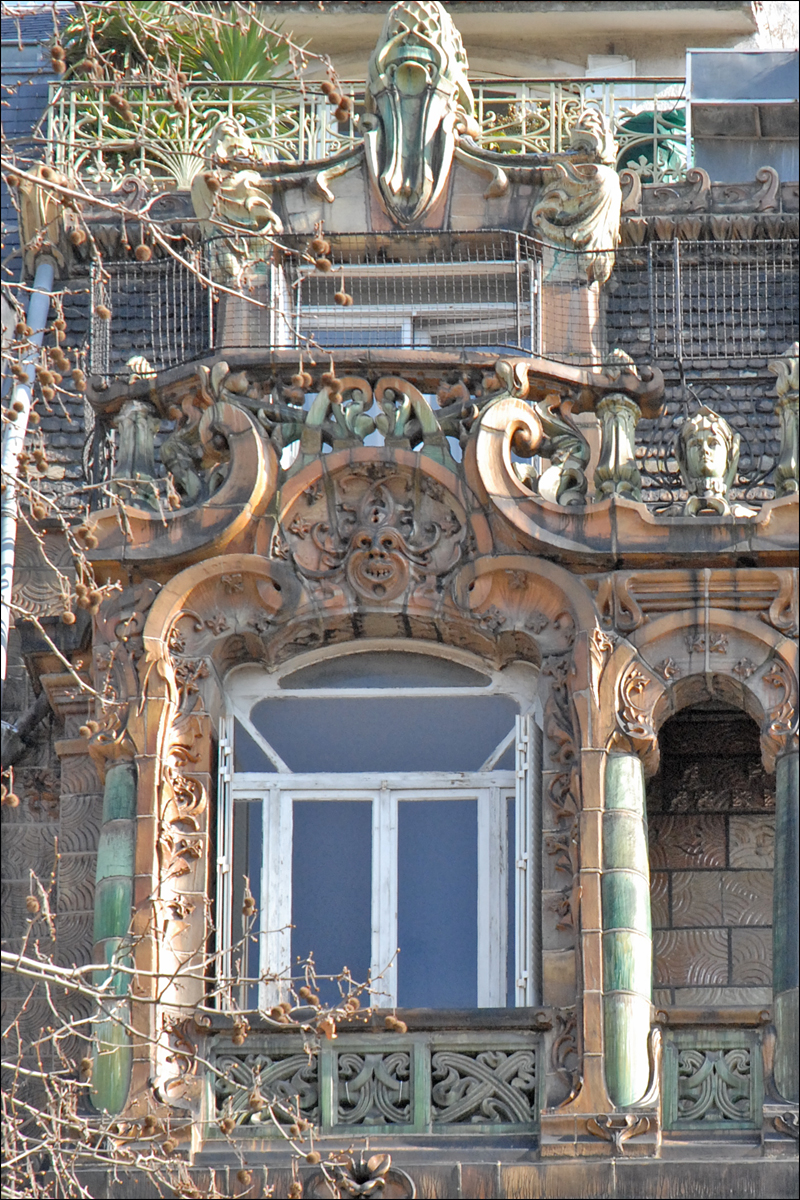

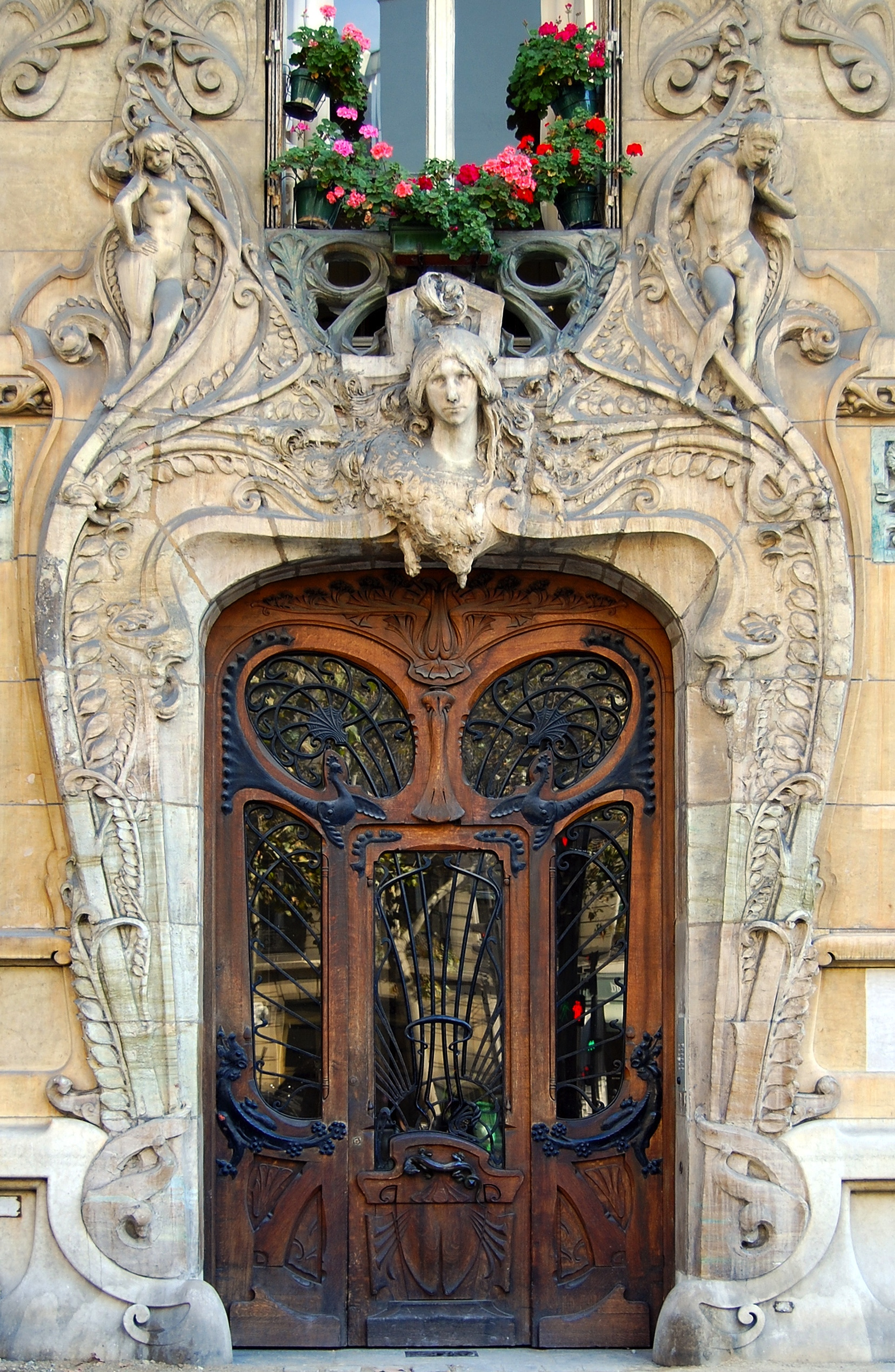

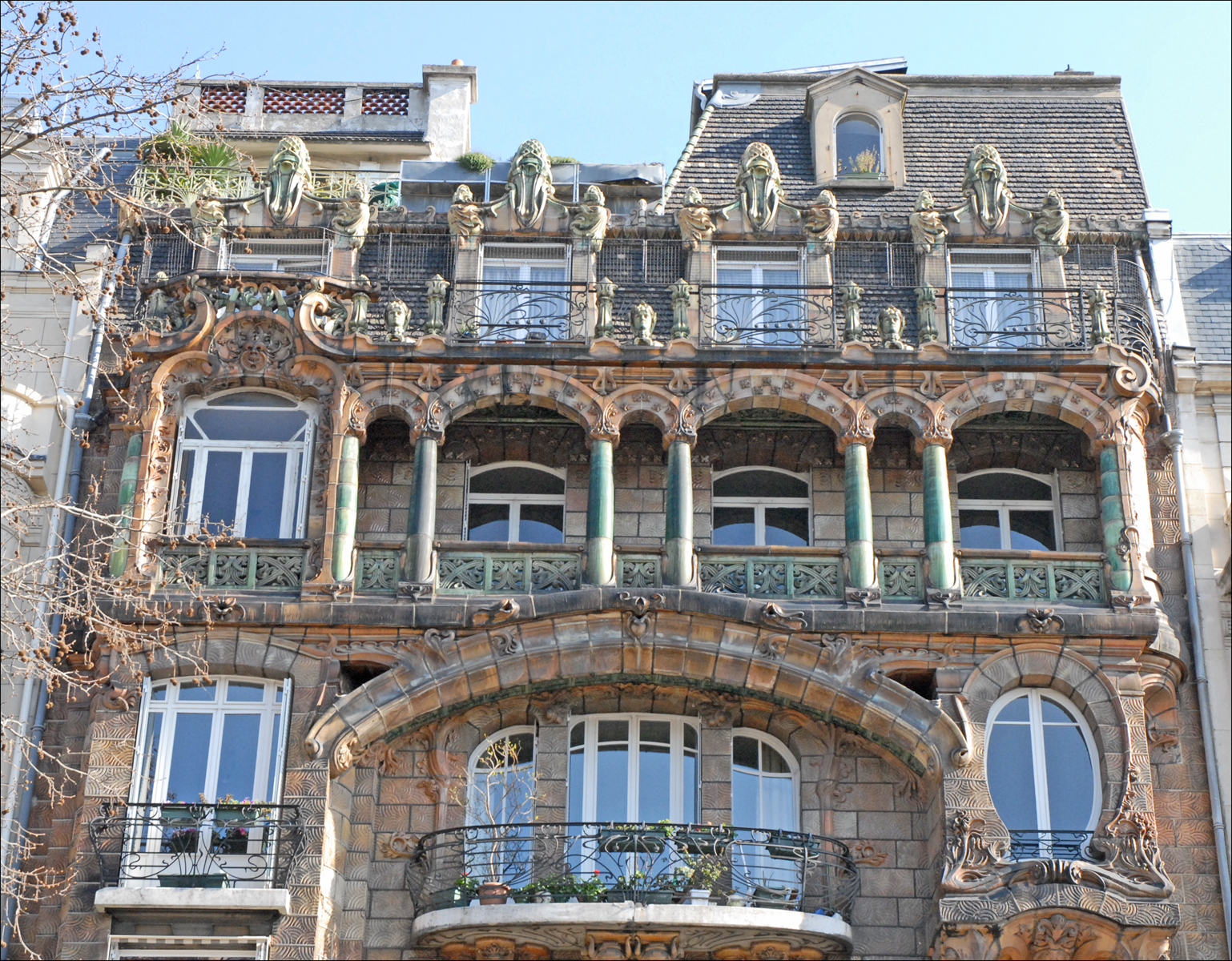

The facade of the ground floor and first floor are relatively simply decorated compared with the upper floors. The centerpiece is the extravagant doorway, framed with statues of Adam and Eve, a woman's head (said to be the wife of Lavirotte, the painter Jane de Montchenu), and vegetal designs. The doors are decorated with wrought iron lizards. The windows of the first floor are richly sculptured. The upper floors are entirely faced with glazed and colored ceramic tiles, with lavish sculptural decoration, vegetal and animal themes, curved windows, curling wrought iron railings and picturesque balconies.

Some observers claim to have found many erotic elements in the facade, including Adam and Eve, and a multitude of phallic symbols in the decoration, including the sculptures over the top-floor windows, sculpture, and the sculpted iron lizards on the doors (a term in Parisian argot for a male sexual organ), as well as in the shape of the front door, which they claim are in the form of the female sexual organ (See external links below). However, others see simply decoration.

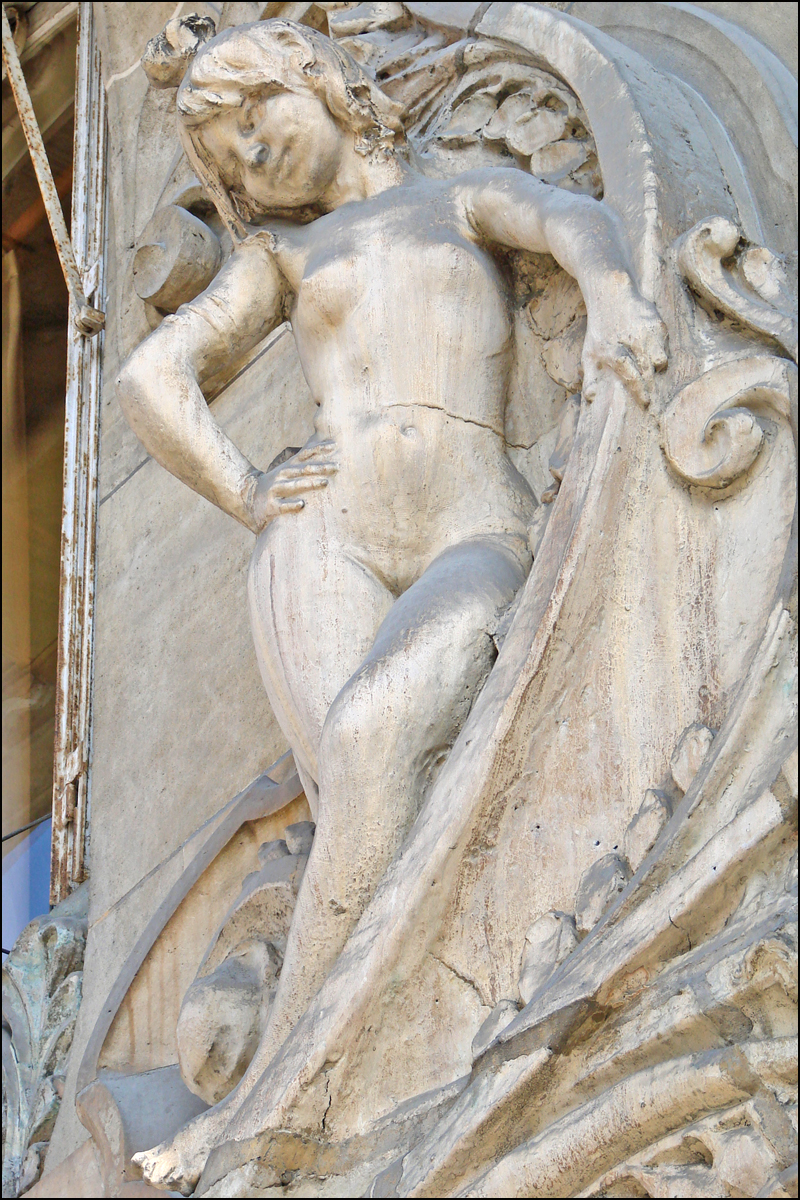

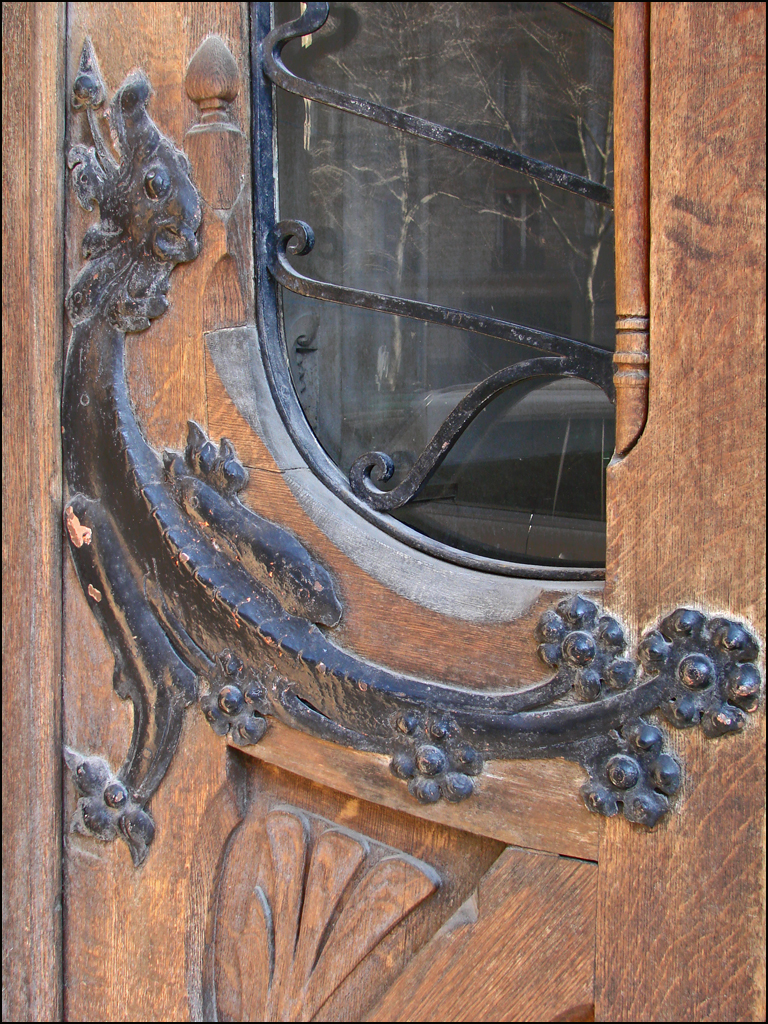

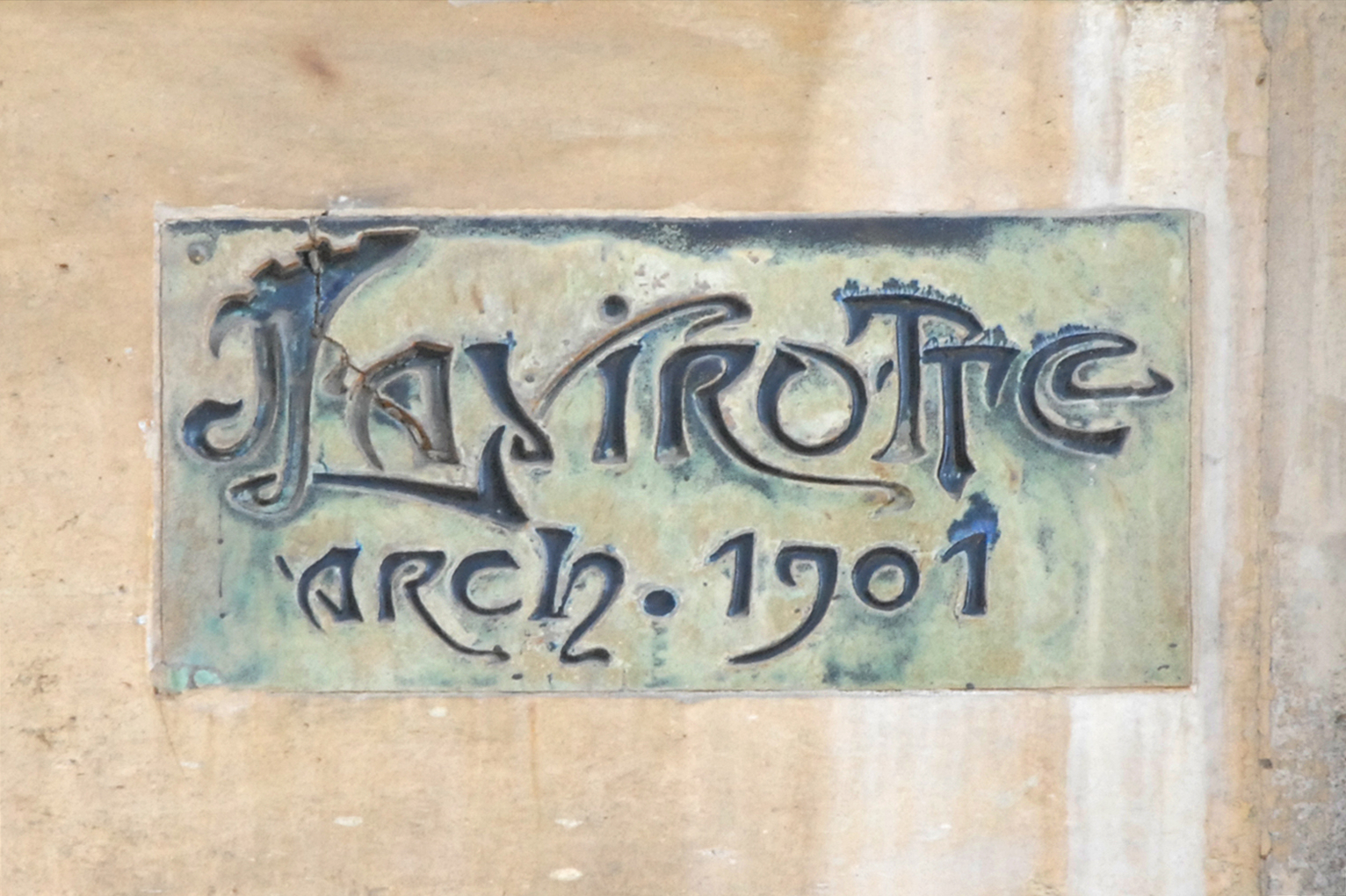

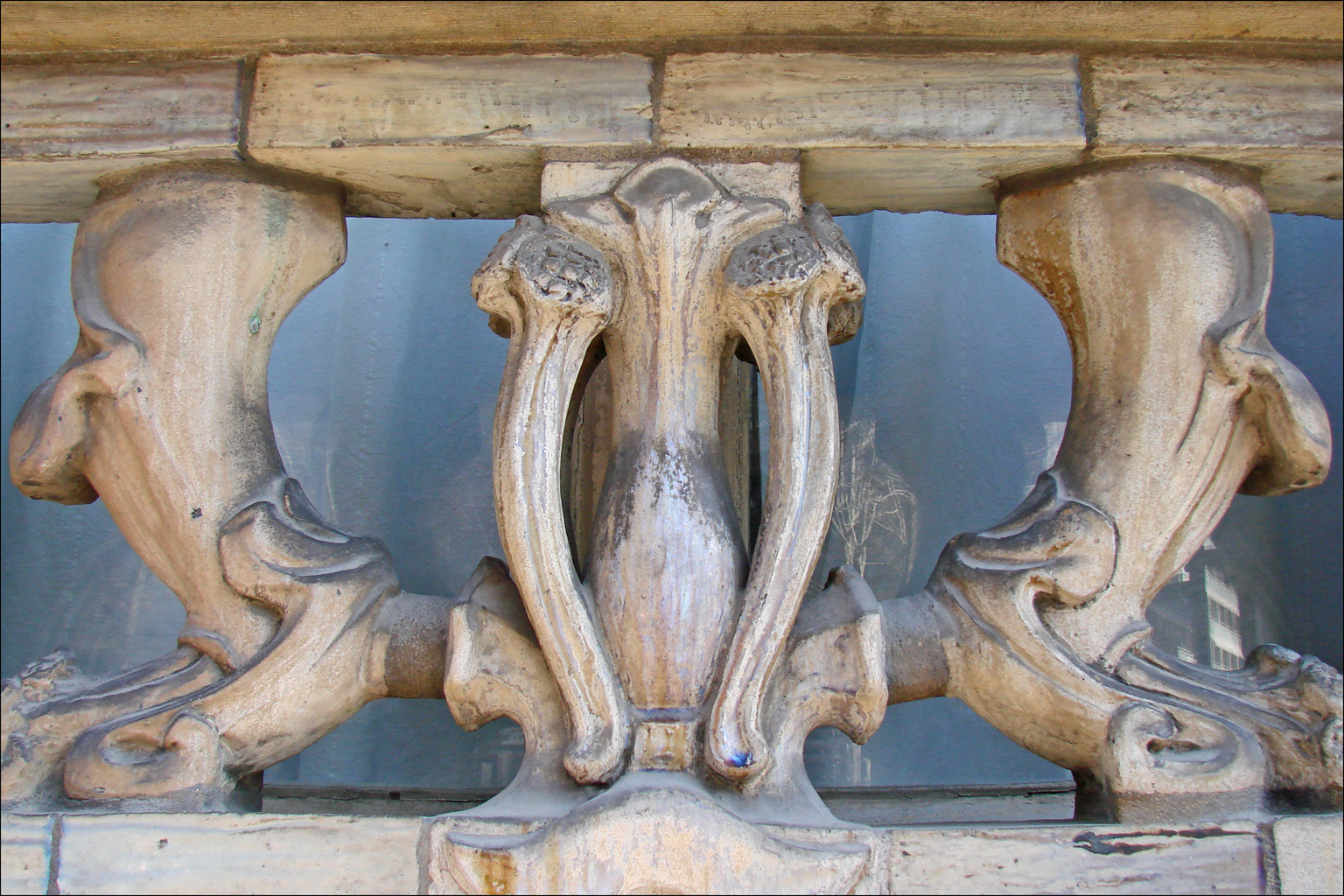

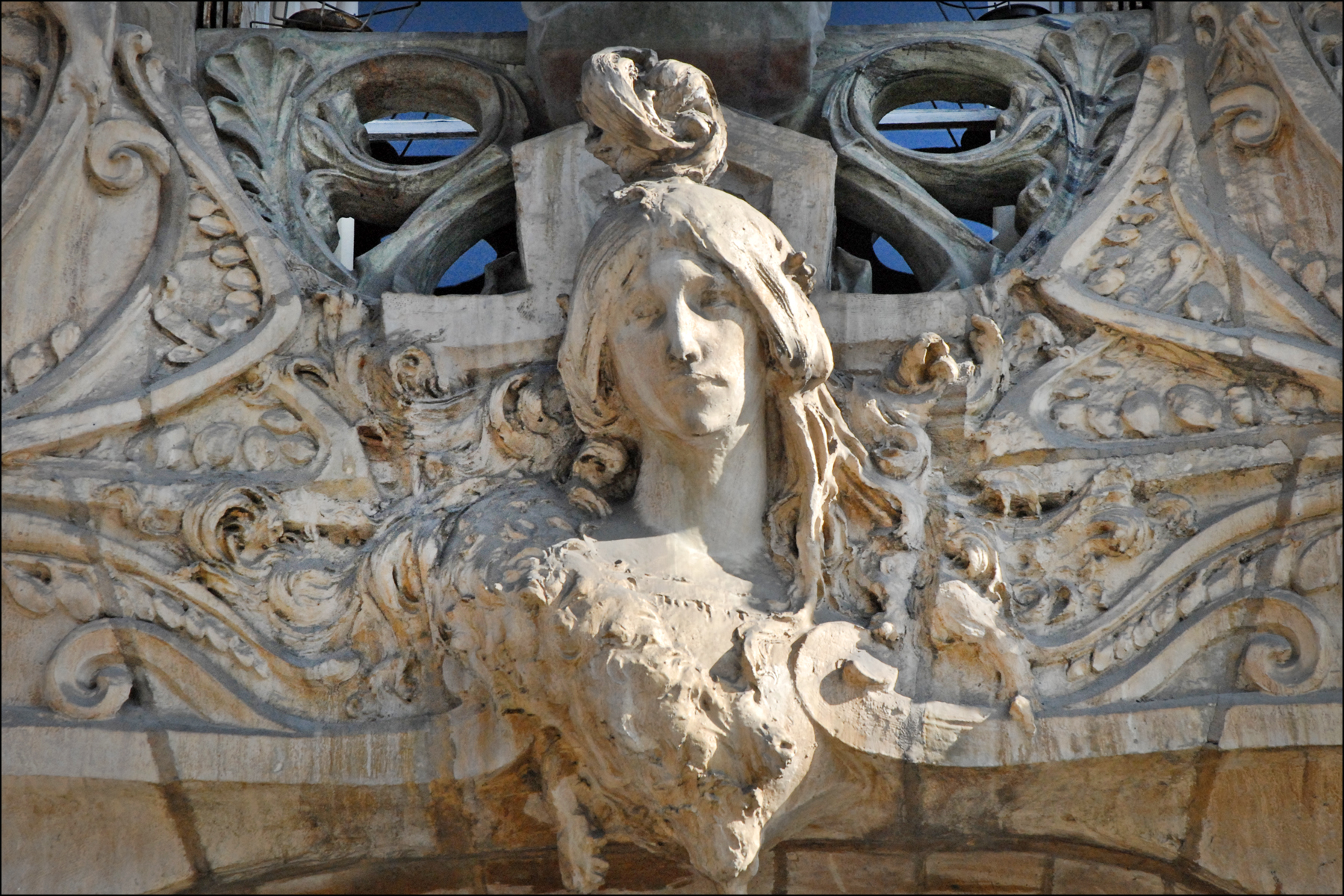

== Interior ==
The interior of the building features much art nouveau decoration, but is more subdued than the exterior. The vestibule is decorated with curved archways supported on marble columns, with short stairways leading to an apartment (now a dentist's office) on one side and to the main stairway on the other. The stairway is the central decorative of the interior; the entrance has a door decorated with wrought iron and glass, and the railing of the stairway is made up of undulating iron work in exotic vegetal forms. The ground floor also features finely-crafted stonework and sculptural detail. The walls of the stairway are decorated with art nouveau floral designs in subdued browns, golds and reds. At the top of the stairway, another smaller stairway leads to the rooftop terrace. A covered passage on the street level leads to a small interior courtyard, which is more simply decorated than the facade, but has sculpted art nouveau lintels around the windows.

== Style ==
It combined elements of Baroque with vegetal and floral patterns, and highly ornamental ironwork. The architectural critic Gilles Plum wrote in 2014: "The building of Jules Lavirotte is a rare example of free composition pushed to the limits, with expensive materials giving rich plastic effects."

== See also ==
- Jules Lavirotte
- Architecture of Paris
- Paris architecture of the Belle Époque
- Art Nouveau
- Concours de façades de la ville de Paris
