= Mer =

Mer or MER may refer to:

== Business ==
- Management expense ratio
- Market exchange rate
- Merrill Lynch's former NYSE stock symbol

== People ==
- Francis Mer (born 1939), a French businessman, industrialist and politician, former Minister of the Economy
- Gideon Mer (1894-1961), an Israeli scientist working mostly on the eradication of malaria
- M.E.R. (Maria Elizabeth Rothmann), an Afrikaner writer
- Mer (community), a community found primarily in the Indian state of Gujarat

== Places ==
- Mer, Loir-et-Cher, a commune in the Loir-et-Cher département of France
- Merionethshire, historic county in Wales, Chapman code MER
- Mer Island, Queensland, also known as Murray Island, an Australian island

== Sports ==
- Meralco Bolts, a team in the Philippine Basketball Association

== Science ==
- Mer, a synonym for repeat unit in chemistry
- Mer, a type of geometric isomer of octahedral complexes (see fac–mer isomerism)
- -mer, an affix meaning "part", used in several words in chemistry and biology
- MERTK, MER, or proto-oncogene tyrosine-protein kinase MER, a human enzyme
- Membrane estrogen receptor, or mER, a receptor for estrogen
- Proto-oncogene tyrosine-protein kinase MER (or MERTK or Mer)
- abbreviation of Meridional, a direction on a globe
- Mercury transporter, Mer Superfamily of transport proteins

== Technology ==
- Mer (software distribution), a software distribution for operating systems based upon the Linux kernel targeted at mobile devices
- Mars Exploration Rover, one of a pair of robotic rovers exploring the surface of Mars
- Modulation error ratio, a measure in communications for evaluation of digital transmission equipment
- Mechanical equipment room or mechanical room, used for HVAC, water heaters, plumbing and electrical equipment
- Project Mer, a 1958 U.S. Navy human spaceflight proposal to the Advanced Research Projects Agency

== Transport ==
- Manx Electric Railway, an interurban tramway on the Isle of Man
- Merthyr Tydfil railway station (National Rail station code), a railway station in Wales
- Merri railway station, Melbourne

== Other uses ==
- MER, acronym for "Minimum Essential Requirements"
- Mer (community), a community native to the Porbandar region in Saurashtra, India
- Mer, a planet from The Pirates of Dark Water
- Mer, a race in The Elder Scrolls series of video games
- Mer, a given name related to Margarete
- Mer (French: [mɛʁ]), the French word for "sea"
- "Mer", a song by band Hyukoh
- Mer language (disambiguation)
- Middle East Report, a publication of the Middle East Research and Information Project
- Movement for European Reform, a pan-European political group

== See also ==
- La mer (disambiguation)
- Mers (disambiguation)
- Merfolk (disambiguation), name of the half human, half fish undersea species for the fictional mermen and mermaids
- Mar (disambiguation)
- Mir (disambiguation)
- Merr (disambiguation)
- Meher (disambiguation)
- Mur (disambiguation)
- Murre (bird)
- Myrrh
