= MERP =

MERP may refer to:

- Middle-earth Role Playing
- Medicaid Estate Recovery Program
- MerP, a member of the Mercury transporter
