= Alexandre Bigot =

French artist

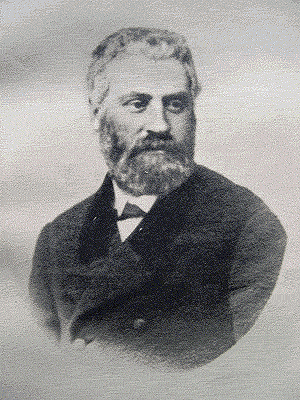
- Undated photograph of Alexandre Bigot
- Born: 5 November 1862; Mer, Loir-et-Cher, France
- Died: 27 April 1927 (aged 64); Paris, France
- Education: Université Caen-Normandie
- Known for: Ceramics
- Movement: Art Nouveau

Alexandre Bigot (French: [alɛksɑ̃dʁ biɡo]; 5 November 1862 – 27 April 1927) was a French ceramicist. He was primarily a ceramics manufacturer, producing the designs of many artists and architects of the French-Belgian Art Nouveau movement, including: Jules Lavirotte, Hector Guimard, Louis Majorelle, Henri Sauvage, Henry van de Velde, Auguste Perret, Andre Arfvidson, Anatole de Baudot and more.

Bigot was a physics and chemistry instructor who became interested in ceramics in 1889 after viewing Chinese porcelain at the Exposition Universelle in Paris. With his knowledge of chemistry, Bigot was able to create glazes with a large variety of colors and finishes.

Bigot's firm was based at Rue des Petites Ecuries, Paris and he also created a ceramics factory in Mer in 1889 which employed as many as 150 people. Siegfried Bing, a German art dealer in Paris, displayed works by Bigot, among others, and was responsible for introducing the Art Nouveau style. Bigot’s Parisian firm closed in 1914 due to a decline in the popularity of Art Nouveau.

== Early life and discovery of ceramics ==
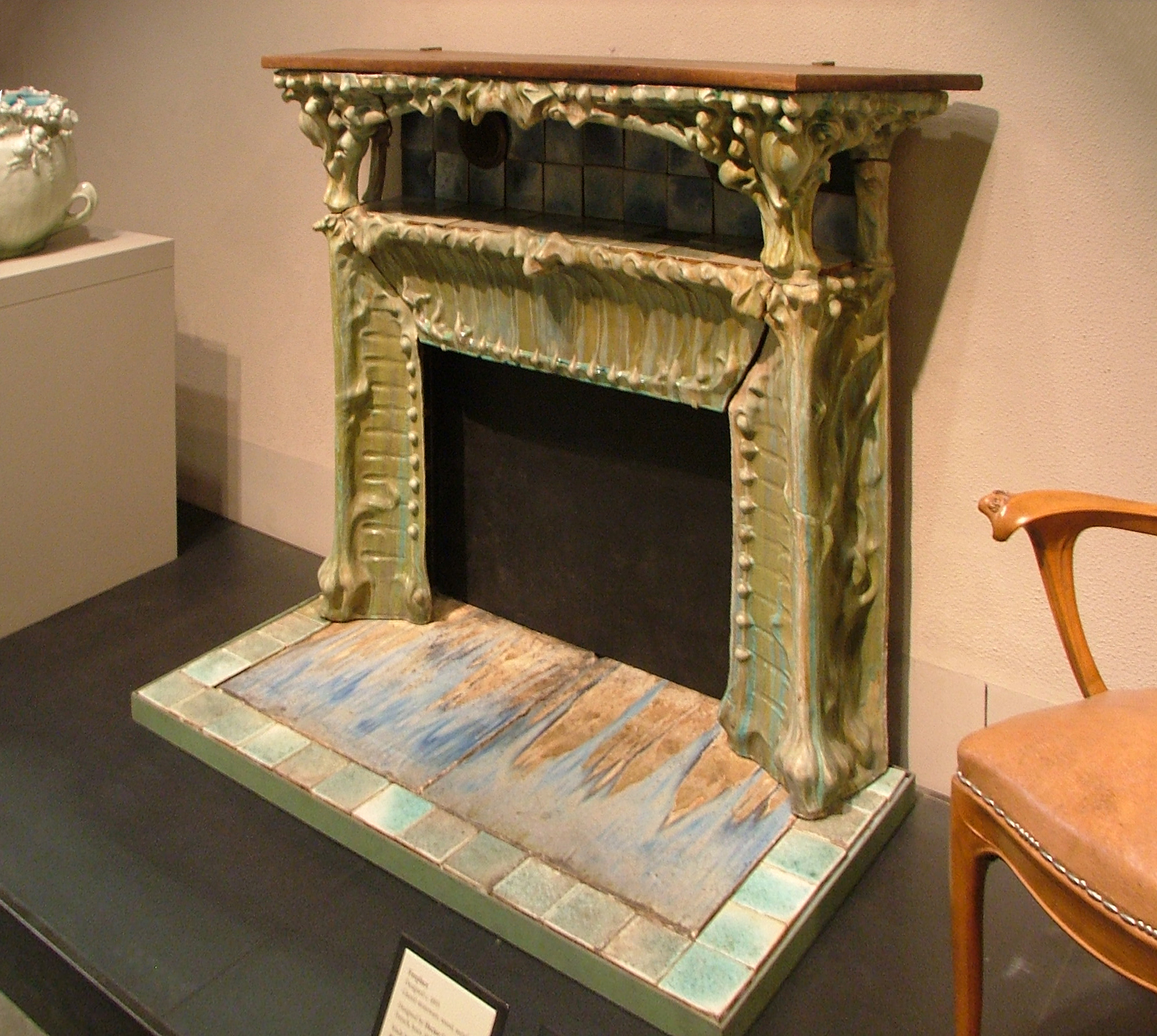
Fireplace designed by Hector Guimard and manufactured by Alexandre Bigot, in the collection of the Philadelphia Museum of Art (United States), ca. 1895

Alexandre Bigot was trained in the sciences before eventually excelling in the arts. He obtained a degree in physics in 1884. He also held a doctorate in chemistry and was interested very early on in creating enamels resembling natural gems. After a brief stint in the studio of Paul Beyer (1873–1945) in Switzerland, and recognizing the limits imposed on setting up a laboratory in Paris, in 1889, Bigot set up his first kiln in Aunay, his hometown (today called Aulnay, now a district within the city limits of Mer). The same year, he became one of many artists of his generation who were attracted to the eastern ceramic wares that they saw at the Exposition Universelle of 1889 in Paris. Among Bigot's contemporaries who found inspiration in Asian ceramics was Jean-Joseph Carriès, who, like Bigot, had his own studio and was engaged in research on ceramics, knowledge that he began to refine upon meeting Bigot. The two artists began a correspondence on the subject, and Bigot became extremely interested in Carriès' work. Bigot's knowledge of chemistry allowed him to become an adviser to Ernest Chaplet for his sculpture and Carriès as well as a collaborator with the chemist Henry Le Chatelier. On the practical side (turning and modeling), he benefitted from the advice of Raphaël Tessier (1860–1937).

== Career in ceramics ==
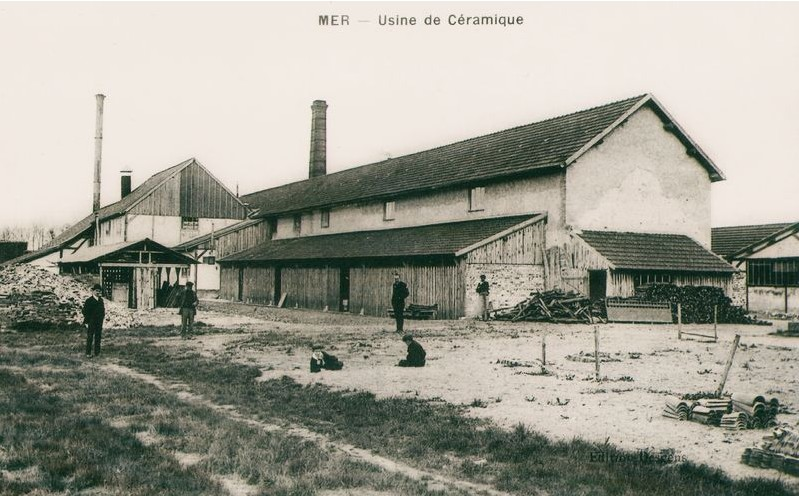
Bigot's ceramics factory in Mer, France, southwest of Paris, ca. 1910

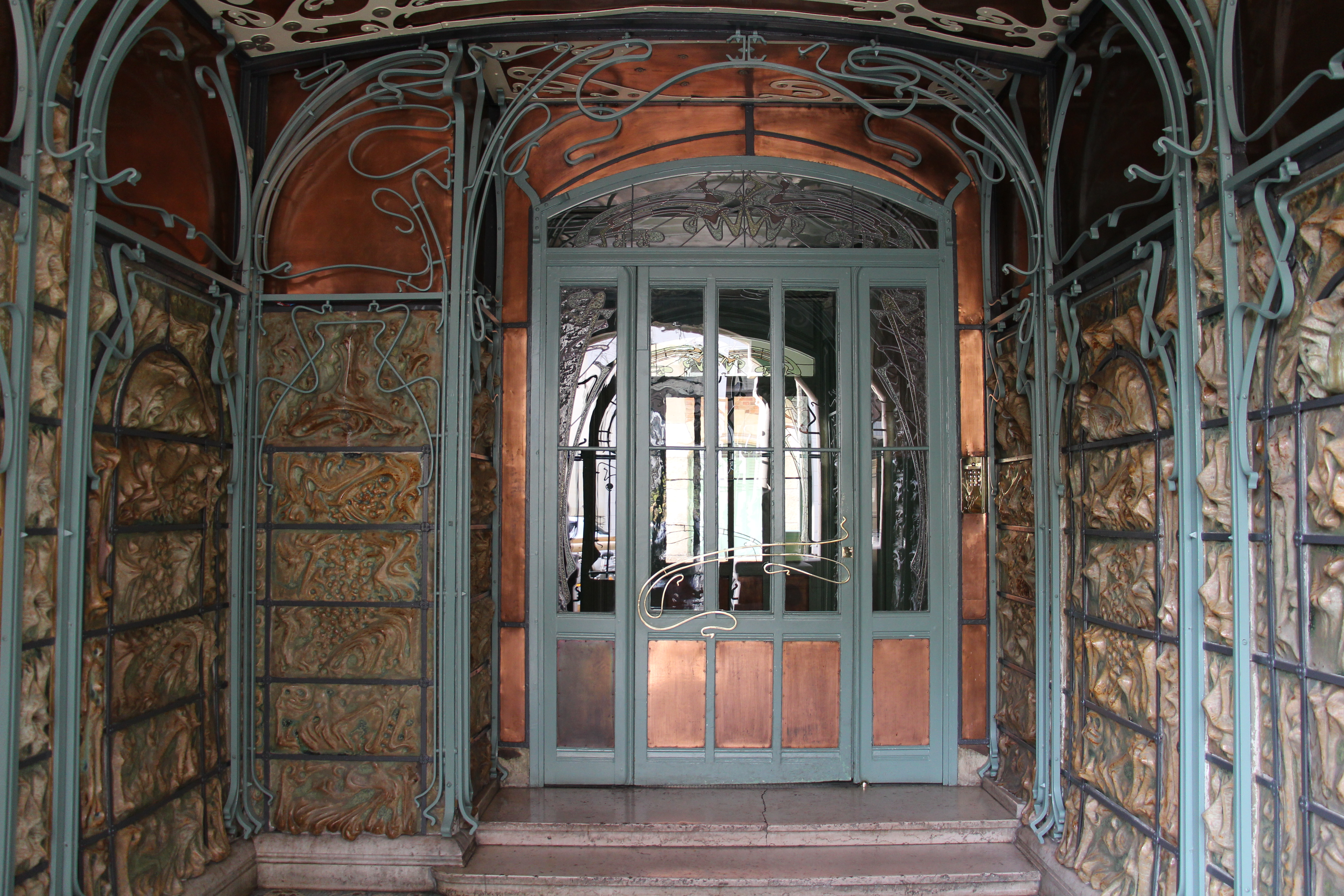
Breezeway of the Castel Beranger in Paris, with wall plates by Bigot (1898)

In 1894, Bigot presented his pieces for the first time at the Salon of the Société nationale des Beaux-Arts. The ceramics used a simple form ornamented with matte enamel using shades of yellow, green, and brown, often with the effect of crystallization. In 1895, he participated in the inaugural exposition of Siegfried Bing's La Maison de l'Art Nouveau, which gave its name to the style.

The year 1897 marked a turning point. Architectural ceramics were reaching the pinnacle of their popularity and Bigot took the opportunity to found his own company, A. Bigot et Cie. This enterprise, which employed up to 150 workers and counted 10 industrial kilns, produced numerous trinkets, vases and vessels which were on display in his shop, which he transferred in Paris from the rue d'Assas to the rue des Petites-Écuries.

Along with Emile Muller, Bigot thus became the principal figure in architectural ceramics in France, and from 1898 he worked to integrate ceramics with façades of reinforced concrete. This architectural outlet explains, by implication, the membership of his company in the Union Syndicale des architectes, but also the relaxation of the urban regulations of 1882 which favored the appearance of projecting elements, such as oriel bays, that broke up the uniformity of façades.

The collaboration with Hector Guimard at the end of the decade marked the beginning of Bigot's fame with architectural ceramics. Before then his work had been confined essentially to baths and restaurants. But in 1898, Guimard's Castel Beranger emerged as the manifesto of Art Nouveau in architecture and its ceramics were commissioned from Bigot, who decorated the façade with picturesque details and covered the entrance breezeway with highly plastic molded panels designed to evoke the atmosphere of a grotto. The material became thus emblematic of the new style before Art Nouveau's decline about 1910.

Bigot's work was rewarded with a Grand Prix at the Exposition Universelle of 1900 in Paris for which he collaborated with Paul Jouve and René Binet on the main entrance gate on the Champs-Elysées. The ensemble of wings enclosing the grand arch of the gate, designed by Binet, was ornamented with two superimposed friezes, executed in multicolored ceramic. The one above represented the triumph of work by the sculptor Emile Muller based on a model by Anatole Guillot; the one below was composed of a suite of animals in an Assyrian style, by Jouve and Bigot.

=== Collaboration with Jules Lavirotte ===
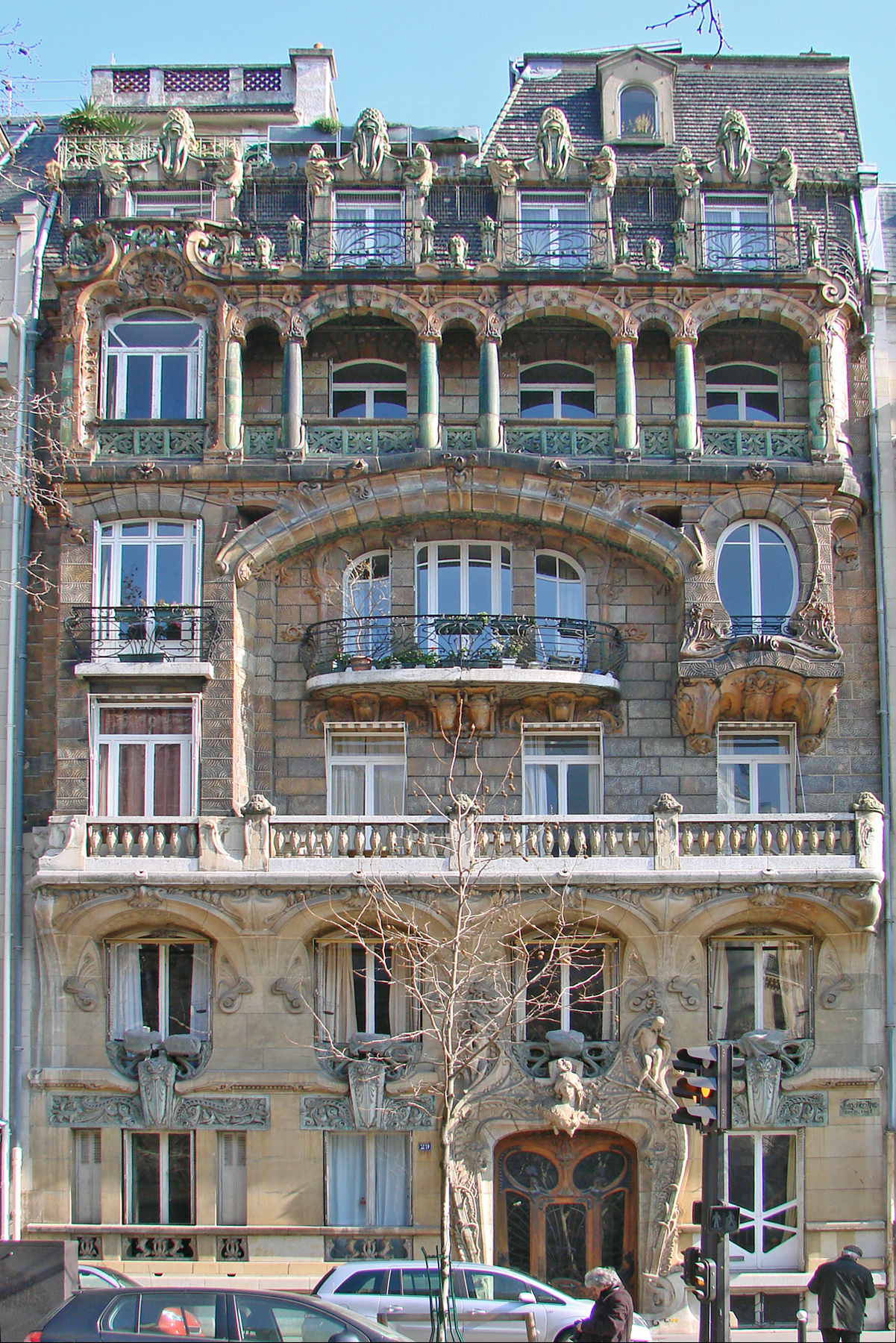
29, avenue Rapp, the most famous collaboration between Bigot and Jules Lavirotte (1901)

Beginning in 1900, the commissions multiplied for Bigot when he found an architect with whom he could showcase his talent: Jules Lavirotte. The latter was an Art Nouveau designer who espoused an eclecticisme with a pronounced taste for daring ornament and was, at the time, just as famous as Guimard. Bigot worked first on the building at 12, rue Sédillot for which his participation was still limited (a few ceramic balusters). He next worked on 3, square Rapp, the edifice on which Lavirotte turned him loose with an eclecticism that was much less restrained than the previous one. It was there that he realized these stunning lintels with suspended heads and the decoration of the staircase with the figure of an infant naiad.

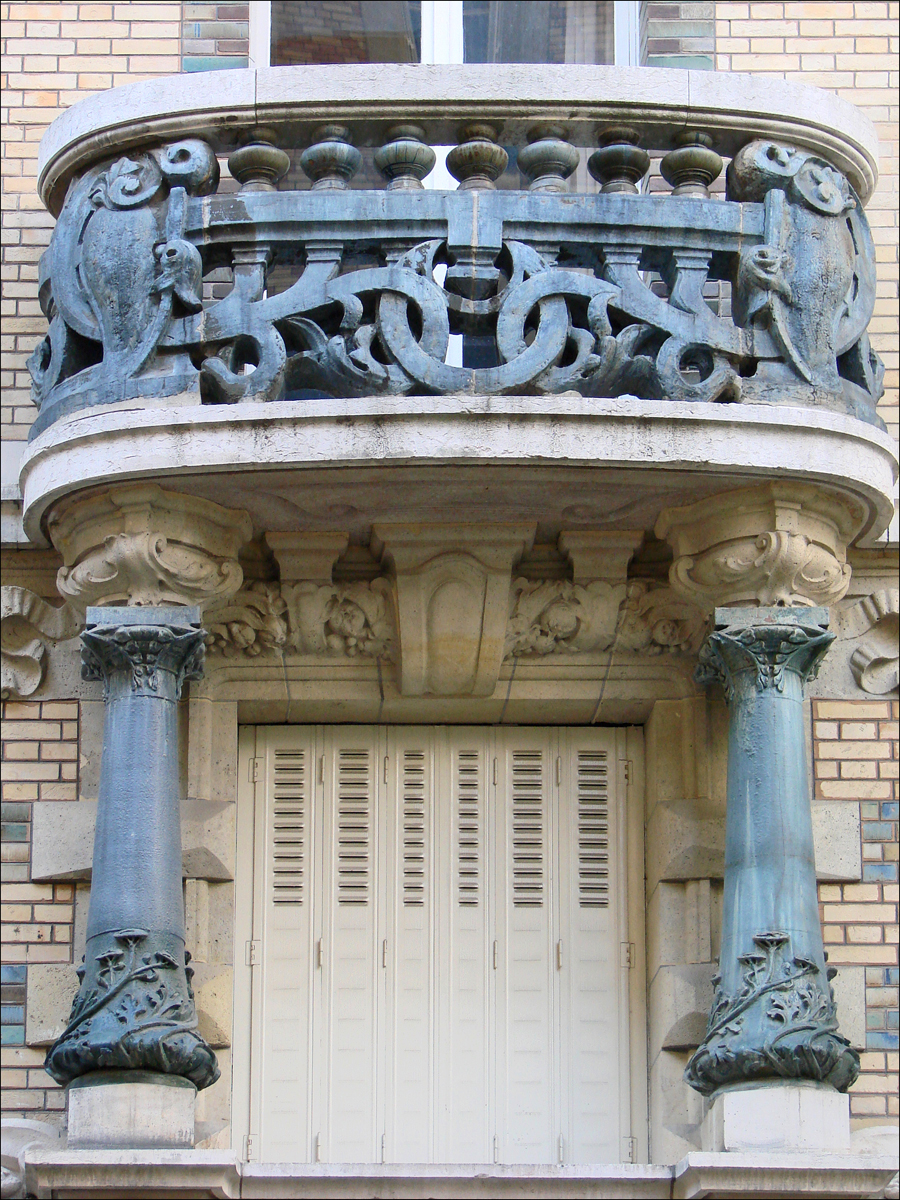
Balcony at 3, square Rapp, manufactured by Bigot (1900–01)

The apartment house at 29 avenue Rapp, built in 1901, was truly the construction which best married the talents of Bigot and Lavirotte. In the age of the development of concrete, they searched for a substitute, comparable material for the ashlar revetment normally employed because the latter was heavy and burdensome. The crown of modernity in England and the United States was to use ceramic as a revetment, but the idea came to France later on. The first to experiment with this in France was François Hennebique (the inventor of the Hennebique system of reinforced concrete), for his own company's headquarters in 1898. In fact, when 29 avenue Rapp was built, the use of ceramic as revetment was still a novelty. This construction was the fruit of the collaboration between Lavirotte, Bigot, and Cottancin, the inventor of the process of construction in reinforced concrete using a very fine skeletal framework. The building was experimental and probably financed by the three men themselves who saw it as a showcase of their respective talents. The objective of Bigot in the building was to show that the ceramic could replace masonry, and he had recourse in this to a framework entirely of reinforced concrete. The trick lay in the weighted hollow pieces of concrete and the reinforcing iron rods in order to guarantee the solidity of the ensemble. then the edifice was covered in plates of ceramic which imitated the traditional manufacture in carved stone. Wishing to show off the talents of the artisan, Bigot produced the head of the woman surmounting the main entrance without creating a mold, firing the original work of Jean-Baptiste Larrivé directly in the kiln. This building served as a manifesto of technique and it was imitated in the coming years, definitively assuring Bigot's reputation.

The same trio (Bigot, Lavirotte and Cottancin) reunited in 1903 for the apartment house at 34, avenue de Wagram, also known as the Ceramic Hôtel and also integrally revetted with ceramic. The sculptures were completed by Camille Alaphilippe. It received the grand prize for the Concours des Façade of Paris in 1905. The jury of the contest, however, declared:

The principal interest in this house is the use of brick and the enameled faïence which covers the construction from its sub-basement to the summit. The architect displays to the passers-by an ensemble of which the color is harmonious but the framework is less agreeable, seemingly made in order to defy the most free aesthetic. The jury, in declaring the author of the façade as the winner, is stuck on the question of greater freedom. One should not altogether view its decision as an encouragement of the beastly forms of the architecture...the decor in majolica can give material form to the happy effects without which there would be need to resort to the dispositions little in agreement with the genius of our French art, the most beautiful productions of which are characterized by simplicity and logical sanity.

In 1914, Bigot ceded direction of the company Bigot et Cie to Camille Alaphilippe in order to become a technical advisor to the ceramics industry. In the interwar period, the thirty-some employees at the plant produced mostly conduits for the canal and drainage industry.

=== Bigot and sculpture ===
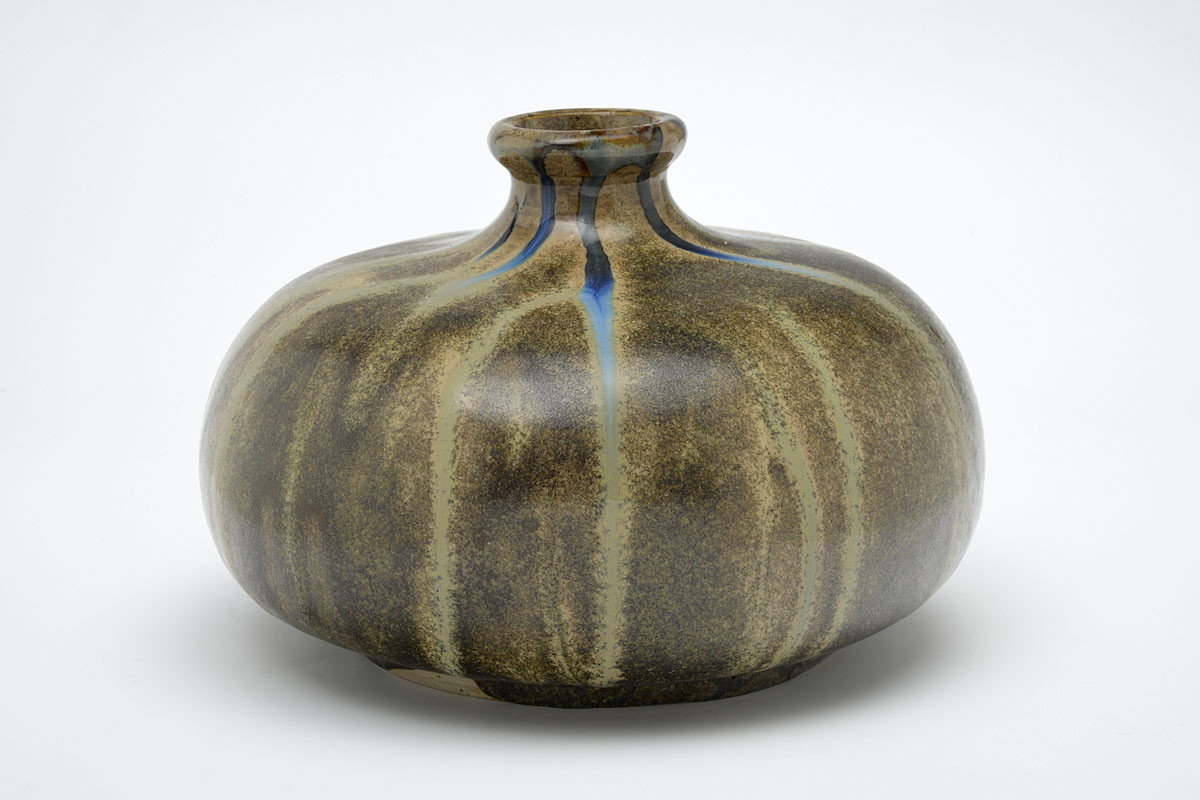
Alexandre Bigot, Vase, 1895, stoneware, acquired by Siegfried Bing in 1896, Hamburg Museum of Arts and Crafts

At the end of the nineteenth century, sculpture was dominated by an overarching interest in polychromy. Ceramic thus came to play a considerable role in the field, replacing faïence, as notably seen in the Salons of 1896, 1897, and 1899, which featured numerous works made of the material. Artists were enthusiastic about this turn, most notably Alexandre Falguière, who boasted about his work La Sortie de l'École ("Leaving the School"):

It's prodigious, you see, not a crack or a small deformation. That's my own work, as it left my hands, with the cuts made by my thumb and fewer by the cutting tool! And how beautiful is the bronze, more sincere, less sad and of a sweetness. The principal actors in this new development are the studios of Emile Muller and Alexandre Bigot and the greatest names in sculpture preach the technique: Falguière, Mercié, Coutan, Fagel, Marqueste, Boucher, Ringel, Injalbert, Roche, Bourdelle, Rodin...

We know little about the links between Rodin and Bigot. Rodin was very interested in ceramic and Japanese art, which he had pioneered in displays at Bing's shop and had worked on with the ceramicists such as Ernest Chapelet, Edomond Lachenal, Paul Jeaneney and Jean Carriès. Carriès was a mutual friend of Bigot and Rodin. A single letter signed by Bigot is conserved at the Musée Rodin and it consists simply of a note of congratulations on Bigot's part. It seems nonetheless that Rodin was well known by the Bigot family as eight cards were exchanged between them. While Rodin left no traces of his work with Bigot, however, the same could not be said of his student Antoine Bourdelle. the latter was extremely interested in the new developments in ceramic at the beginning of the century and created casts of his works in porcelain and in ceramic. For the ceramics, Bourdelle called on Bigot and cast his extant works with a series of works entitled Le Baiser (The Kiss), Aphrodite, and Sleeping Infant.

Camille Alaphilippe, inspired by the possibilities of ceramics during his stay at the Villa Médicis in Rome in 1901, produced La Femme au Singe (Woman with Monkey) in 1908. It is composed of a daring assemblage of elements of gilded bronze (head and hands) and of plates of enameled ceramics, mounted on a wood and iron structure held together by a clay mortar, with the joints fabricated from colored plaster. It is likely that the work was executed in Bigot's studio as the signature is not evident, and moreover, Alaphilippe had already collaborated with Bigot on the Ceramic Hôtel in 1903 and he would assume control of A. Bigot & Cie in 1914.

== Selected works ==
=== Castel Béranger, 1894–95 ===
Architect: Hector Guimard

=== Paris Exhibition of 1900 ===
Bigot fabricated René Binet’s designs for the main gateway to the Paris Exhibition of 1900. Bigot's work was acquired in its entirety by Jenő Radisics, the director of the Budapest Museum of Applied Arts and remained in store until 2013, when much of it was displayed at the Museum.

=== Avenue Rapp No. 29, 1901 ===
The Lavirotte Building, designed by Jules Lavirotte, Avenue Rapp no. 29, Paris was the residence of Alexandre Bigot.

In 1901, Jules Lavirotte’s design for this won a municipal competition as the year’s best. Its extraordinary portal is the ultimate in Art Nouveau exuberance. The carved elements feature a central bust of a woman with flowing hair, balanced by carved naked figures rising above the sides.

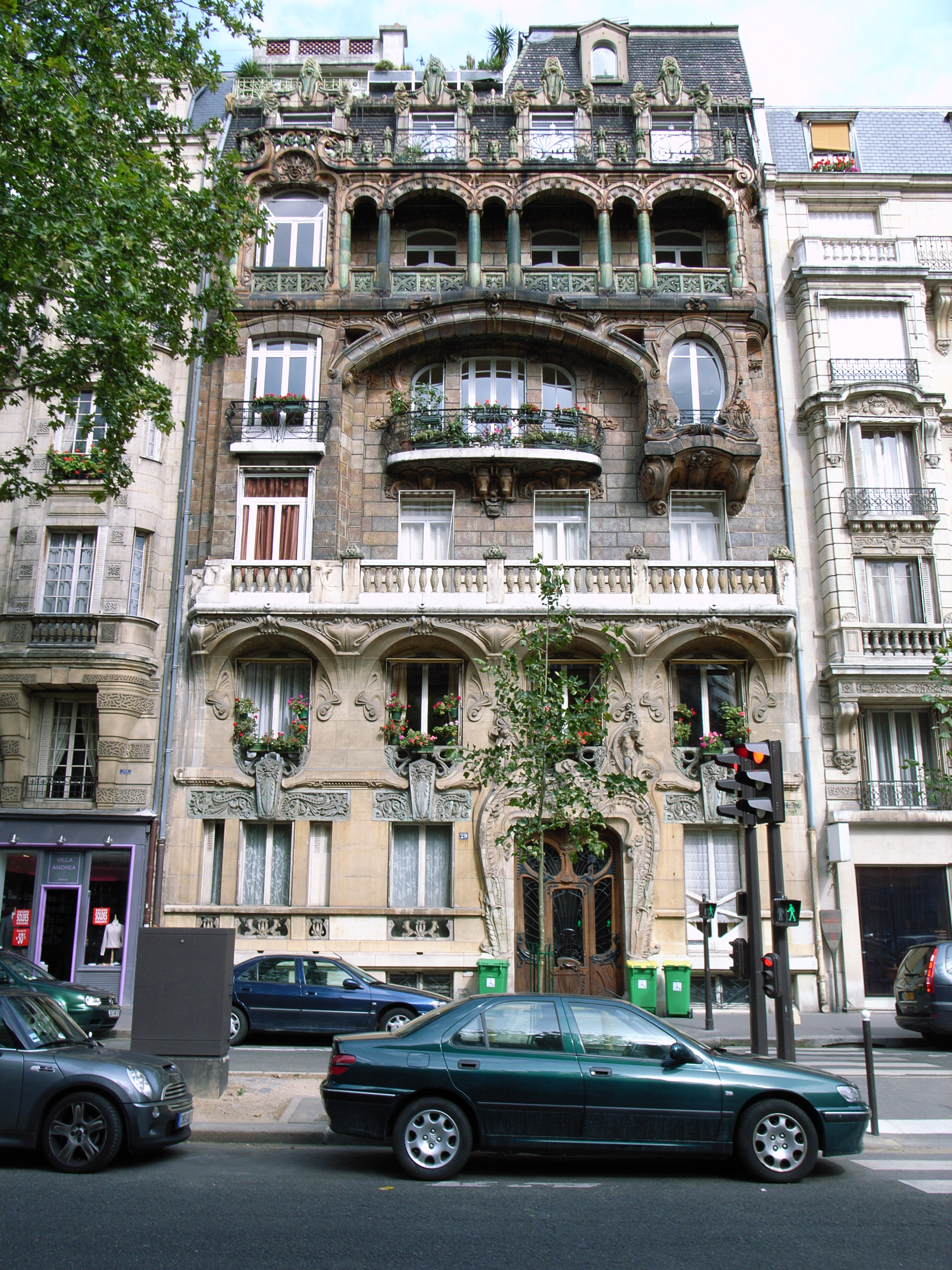

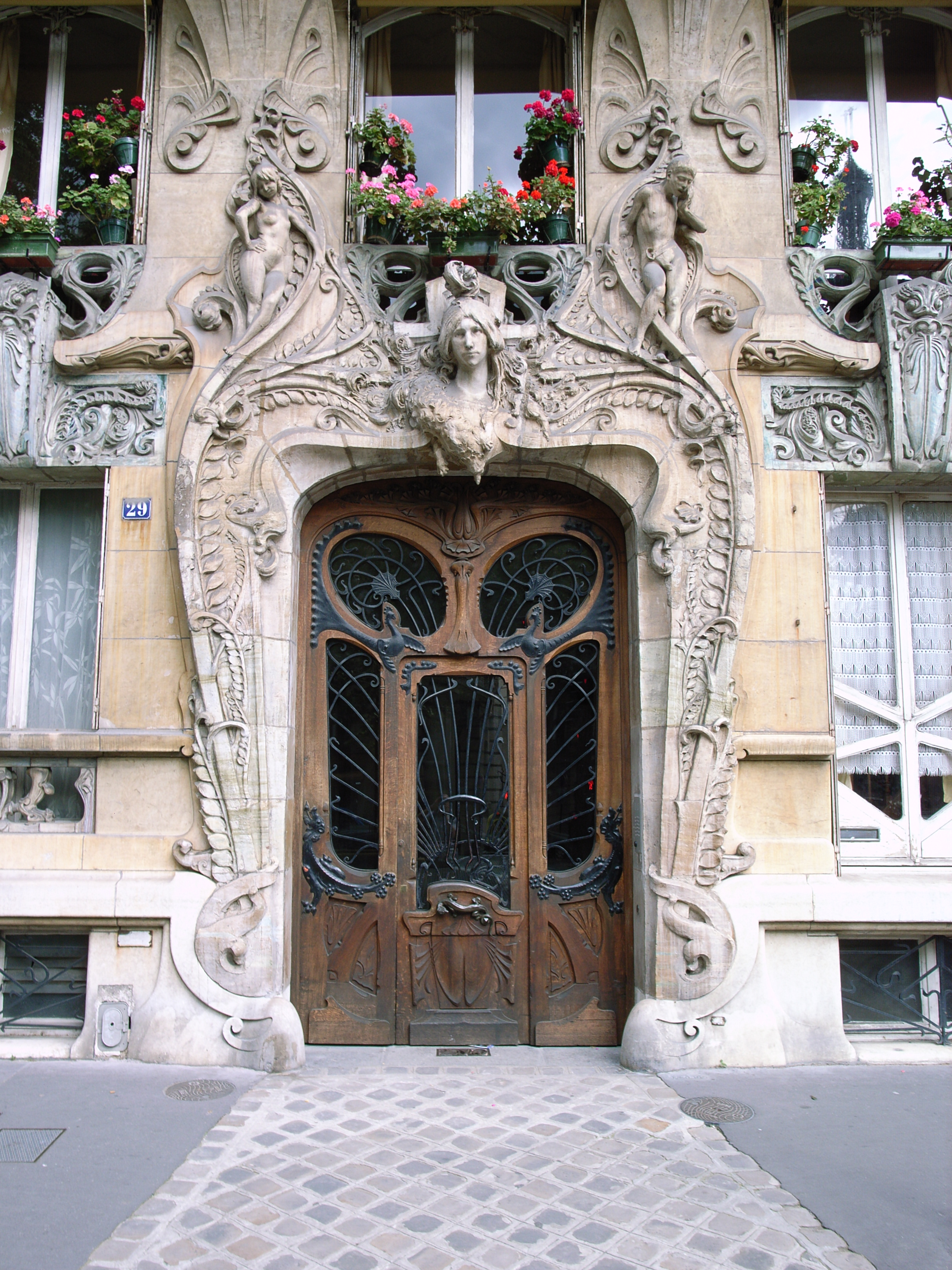

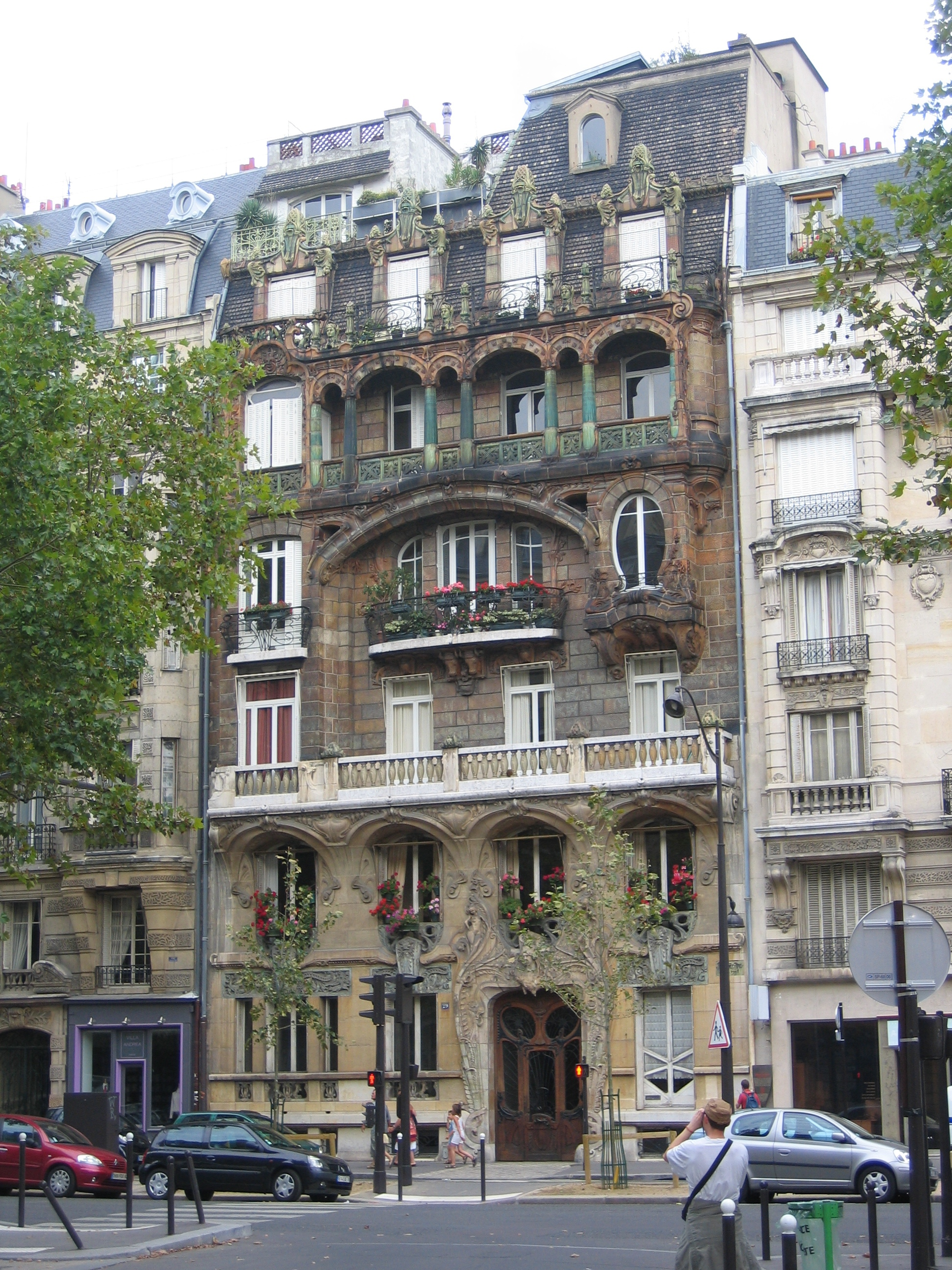

=== Rue d'Abbeville No. 14, 1901 ===
Architects: Alexandre & Edouard Autant

=== Avenue De Wagram No. 34 (Ceramic Hotel), 1904 ===
This reinforced concrete building, built by Jules Lavirotte, was nicknamed "Ceramic Hotel" for its glazed earthenware façade, created by Alexandre Bigot and sculpted by [Camille Alaphilippe]. Exemplifying the sensual Art Nouveau style of turn-of-the-century Paris, this residence won the city prize for the best façade of 1905.

=== Saint Jean de Montmartre ===
Architect: Anatole de Baudot

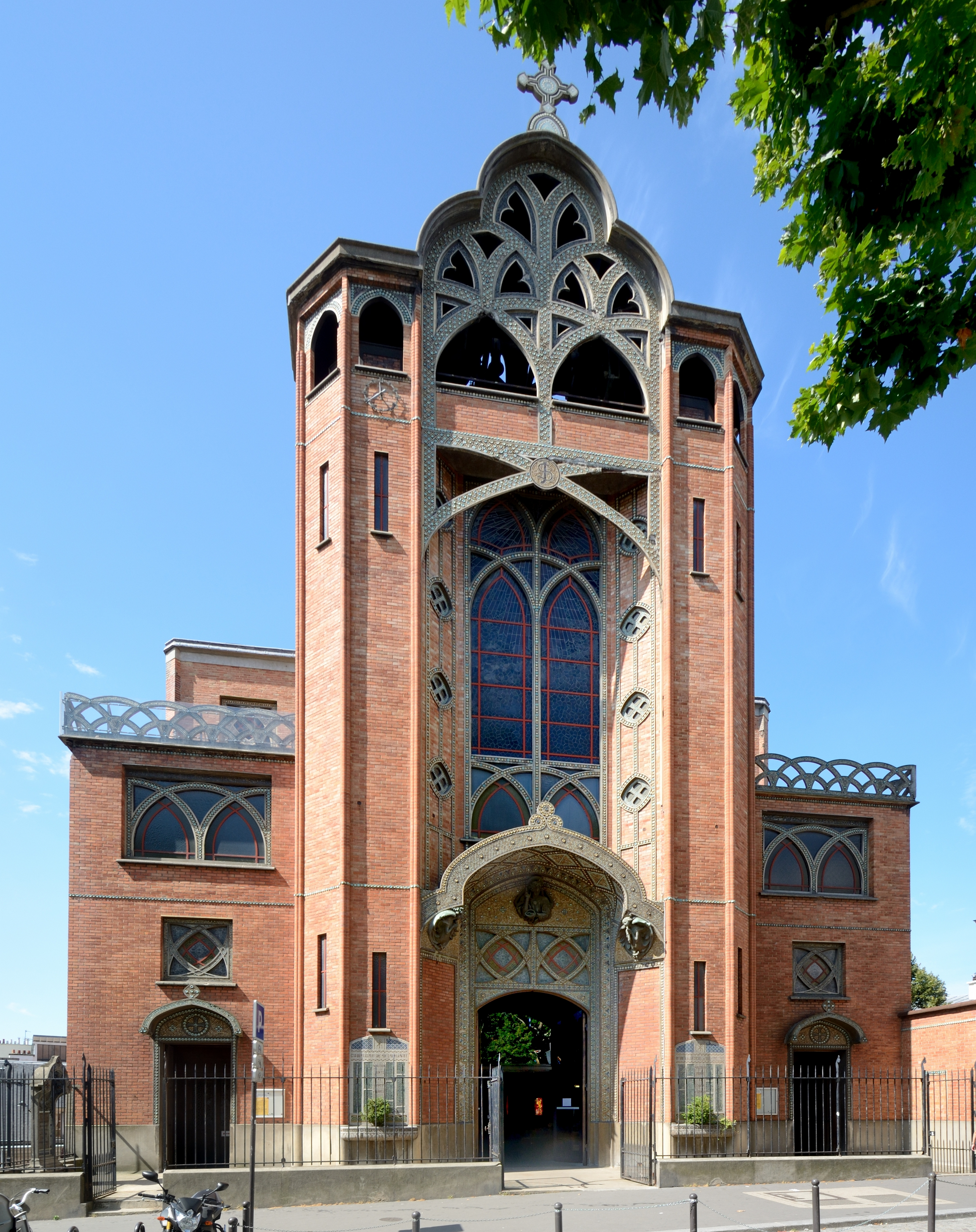

=== Rue Franklin No. 25, 1904 ===
Architect: Auguste Perret

Info

=== Rue Campagne-Premiere No. 31, 1911 ===
Architect: Andre Arfidson

Ceramic detailing gives this industrial façade charm and helped the architect win an award for its frontage in 1911 from the Town of Paris. The sandstone tiling by ceramist Alexandre Bigot covers this reinforced concrete duplex of twenty workshops with residences. The three-dimensional floral elements add geometric patterning to the piers and around the window borders.

=== Smaller works ===
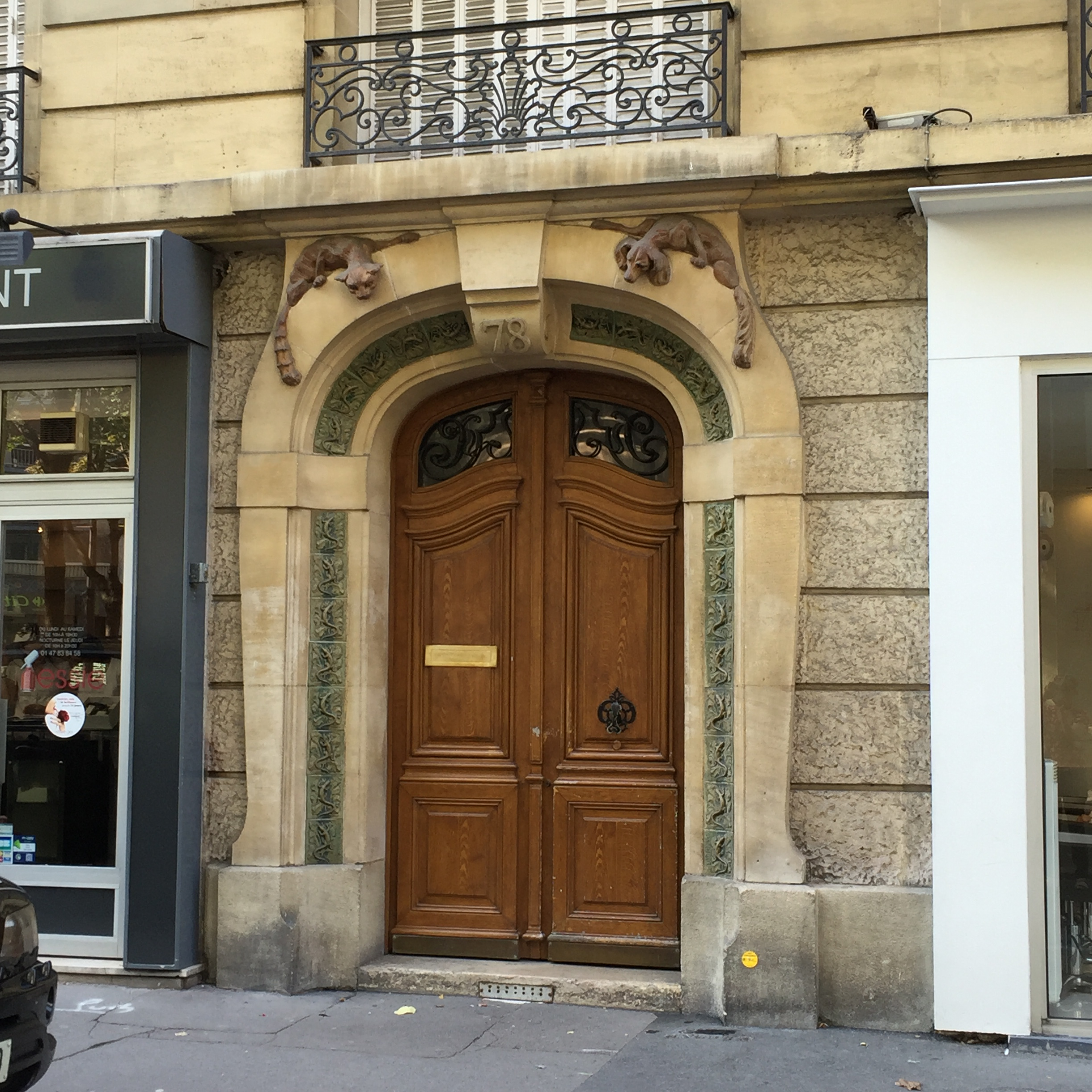
Ceramic tiles by Alexandre Bigot, rue Mademoiselle, Paris

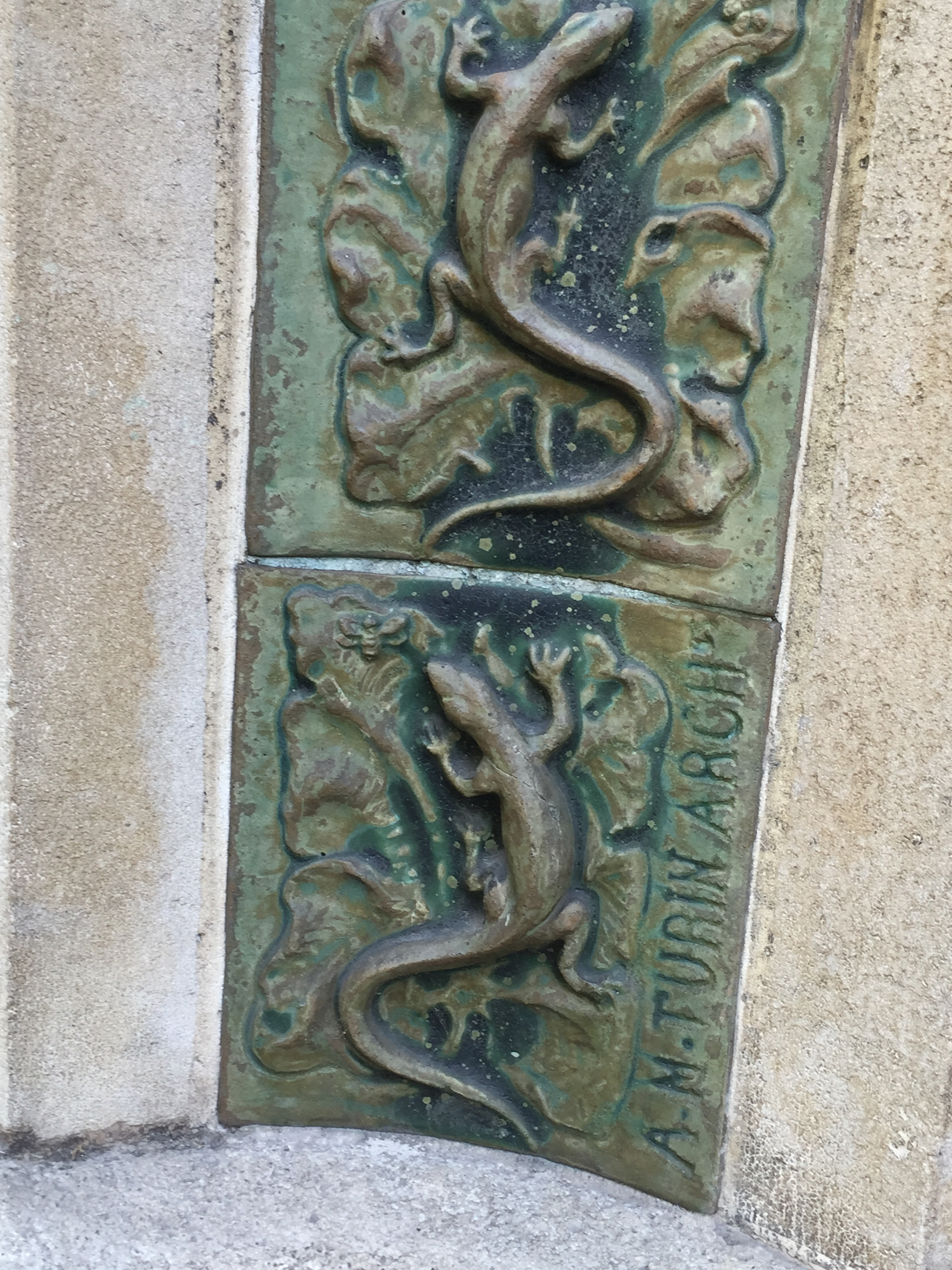
Detail from rue Mademoiselle

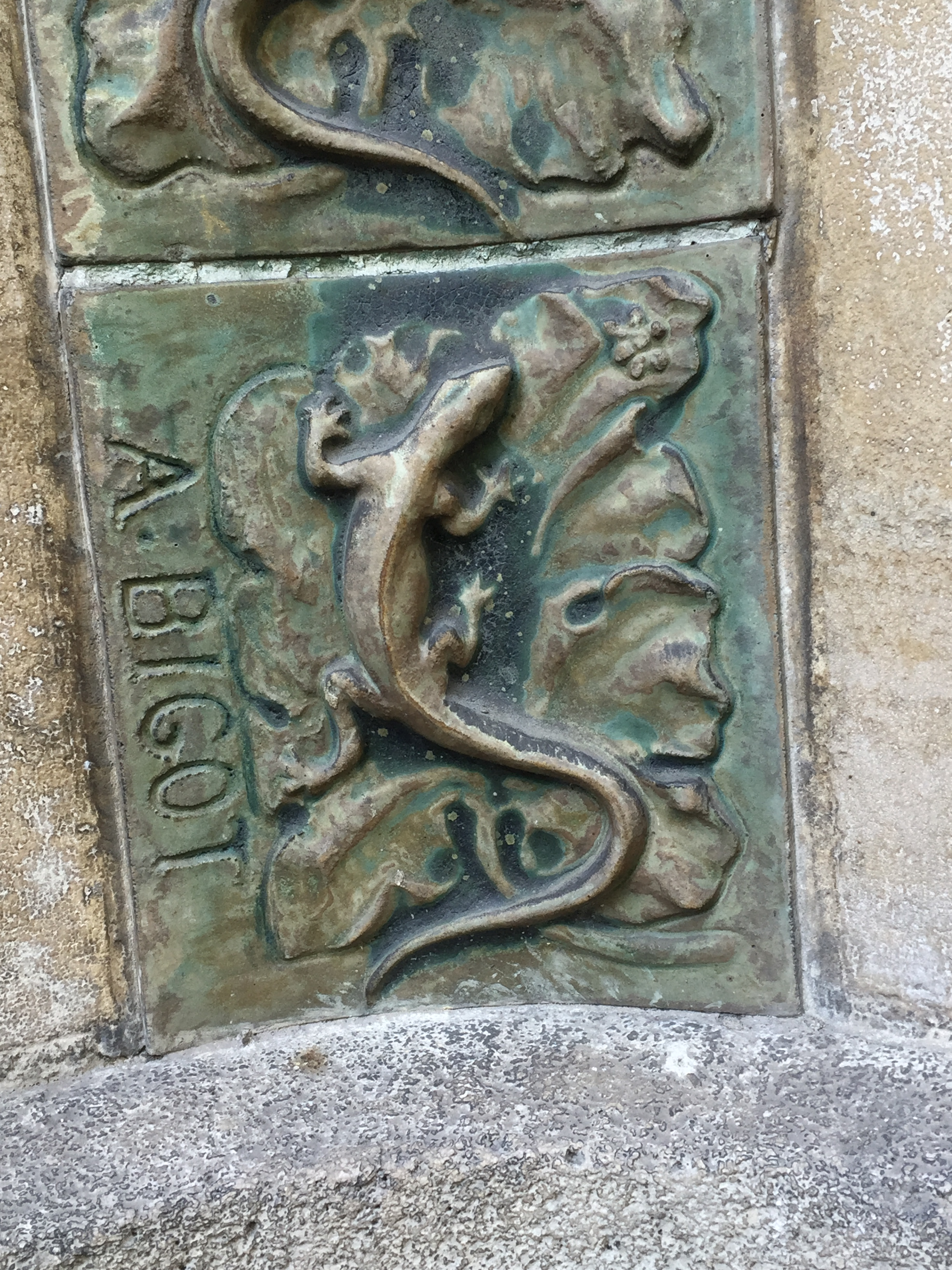
Detail from rue Mademoiselle

== United States patents ==
Patent No. 838,496. Application Filed: February 17, 1903. Patented: December 11, 1906. Link

- A process for the manufacturing of glazed or enameled ceramic ware.

Patent No. 1,497,084. Application Filed: October 6, 1920. Patented: June 10, 1924. Link

- A drying kiln for the production of ceramic ware.
