= Merfolk =

Legendary water-dwelling beings

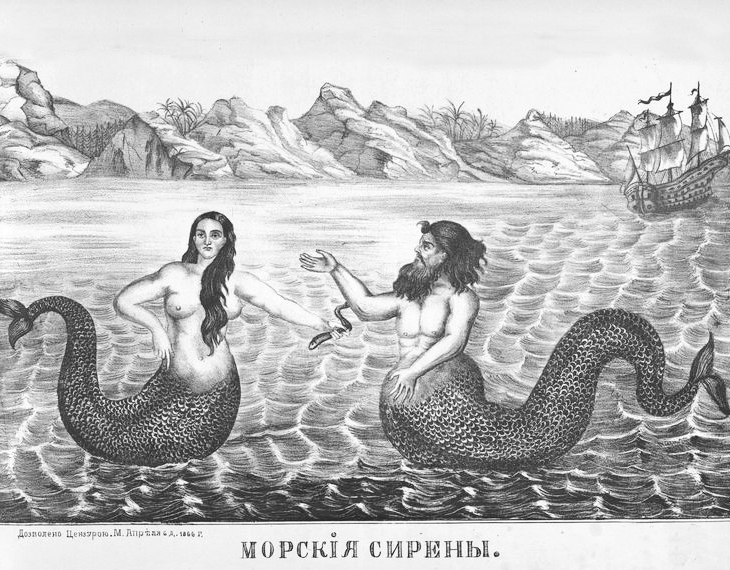
Nude Sea Sirens. 1866 Picture.

Merfolk, Mercreatures, Mermen or Merpeople are legendary water-dwelling, human-like beings. They are attested in folklore and mythology throughout the ages in various parts of the world. Merfolk, Merpeople, or simply Mer refers to humanoid creatures that live in deep waters like Mermaids, Sirens, Cecaelia, etc.

In English, female merfolk are called mermaids, although in a strict sense, mermaids are confined to beings who are half-woman and half-fish in appearance; male merfolk are called mermen. Depending on the story, they can be described as either ugly or beautiful.

Chinese rényú (人魚) stands for "merfolk", but in ancient geographical or natural historical tracts, the term referred to "human-fish" or "man-fish" purported to inhabit rivers or lakes in certain parts of China. The Japanese analogue ningyo (人魚) likewise translates to "human-fish" while, at the same time, having also applied to various human-like fish recorded in writings from medieval times into the Edo Period.

== China ==
Certain fantastical types of "fish", generically referred to as renyu (人魚, "human-fish") are alleged to occur in various parts of China according to the Shan Hai Jing (Classic of Mountains and Seas, 4th century BC). It is mentioned in the Bei Shan Jing ("Classic of the Northern mountains"), Zhong Shan Jing (Central Mountains), and Xi Shan Jing (Western Mountains) sections of this work.

This work and others also mention several additional types of "anthropomorphic fish" with limbs in other regions such as the chiru (赤鱬; "red ru fish") and lingyu (陵魚; "hill-fish"), considered to be in the same category of creatures. Certain tribes or races of humans were also described being part-fish, namely the Di people.

It is recorded that the Mausoleum of the First Qin Emperor was illuminated with lamps fueled by the oil of the human-fish (renyu), whose flames were meant to last a very long time.

In the Chinese Song Dynasty's supernatural tale collection Yijian Zhi (夷堅志), there are stories of sea sirens similar to those in other folklore. One tale describes a beautiful female demon living on a cliff of an island. A man sailed to the island, married a woman there, and she taught him how to recognize plants and avoid dangers, protecting him from wild beasts. They had two sons together. However, when a fellow townsman arrived on the island and took the man back by boat, the woman cursed him, throwing their sons into the water in a fit of rage and yelling at him to leave. The man stayed silent after boarding the ship.

Another tale from Guangzhou tells of a merchant who, upon reaching an island, was captured by two women and taken into the mountains. They fed him daily, but he couldn't tell if he was still alive. After about a year, he overheard the women discussing magic, and he begged them to take him to the place where it was performed. When they did, he sought help, causing the women to flee by flying away. Though he was revived, his food gradually dwindled, and he died two months later.

=== Renyu or human-fish ===
(a.k.a. haieryu. subtypes tiyu and niyu )

Renyu of Jueshui ("Bursting River"), Mt. Dragon-Marquis.

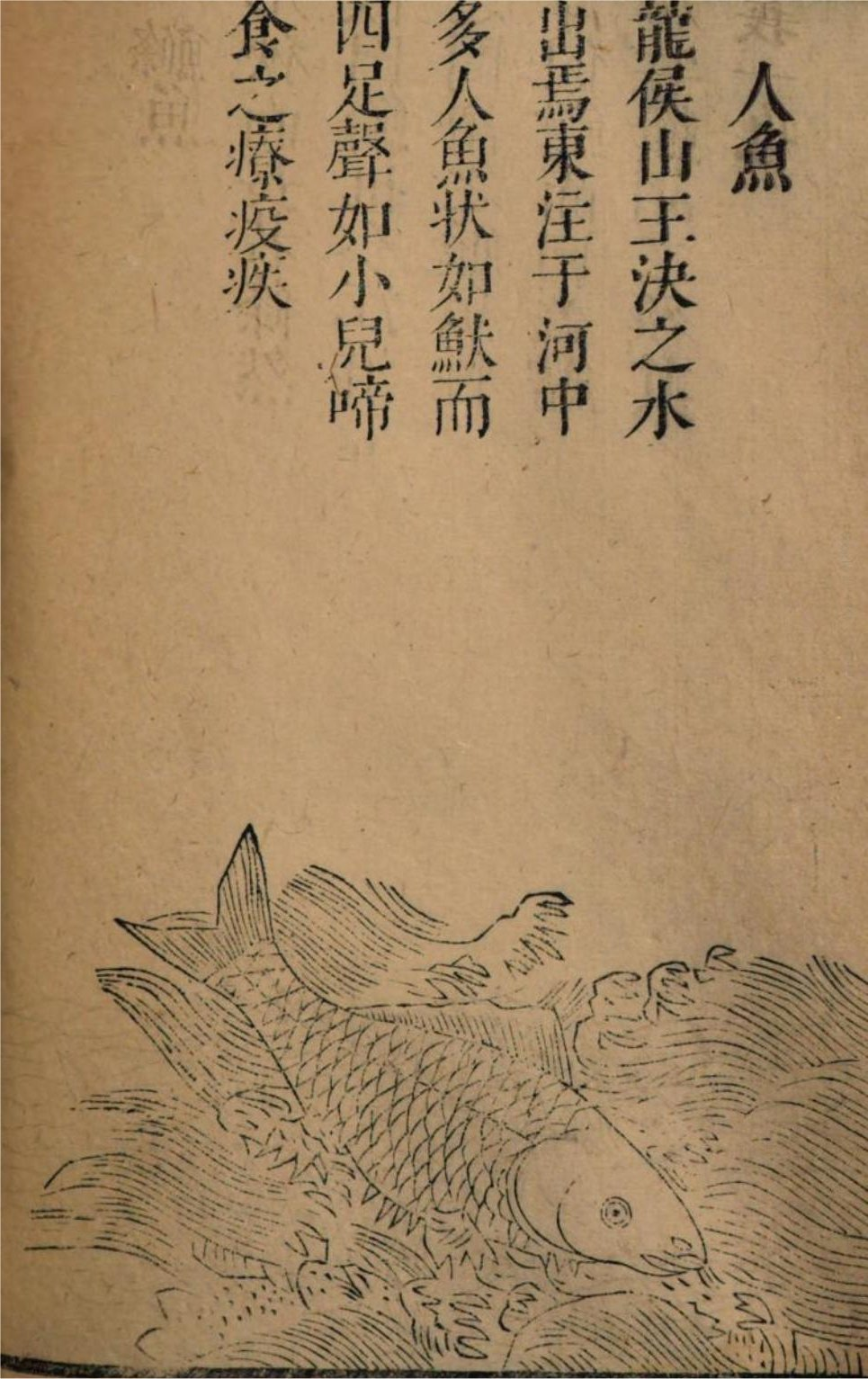
Described as resembling a fei 𩵥 type of fish.
― Wang Qi. Sancai Tuhui (1609) (Note: The accompanying text here says the renyu resembles a fish called fei.)

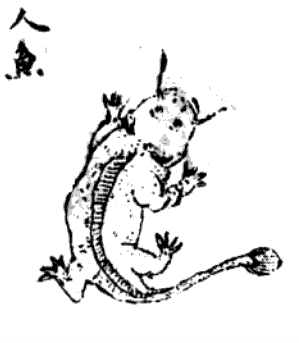
Described as resembling a tiyu 䱱魚. (Note: Image for the tiyu (renyu/haieryu) in Suzuki tr. 1929 Benca Gangmu is reproduced in Kuzumi 2006b, p. 60 which resembles this picture.)
―Wang Fu(d. 1759) Shan hai jing cun, pub. 1895

The renyu (人魚; human-fish) is described in the Bei Shan Jing ("Classic of the North Mountains") section as dwelling on Mt. Longhou (龍侯山, "Dragon-Marquis Mountain") in the waters of the Jueshui (決水, "Bursting River"), which flows eastward into the Yellow River. (Note: Alternatively, River BurstBurst (決決水) on Mount Dragonbutt.) It is said to "resemble the tiyu" (translated as "resemble catfish") (Note: Cf. Unschuld tr. (2021), p. 733:) (Note: The tiyu is not literally a catfish but a subtype of renyu "human-fish", according to the Bencao Gangmu, as given below. However, this translation may be justified in the light of Guo Pu's commentary to the Bei Shan Jing, which reads "The renyu is, namely, the niyu. It resembles catfish with four feet/legs, and voice like a child crying. Nowadays this catfish is also called the ti 人魚即鯢也。似鮎而四足、聲如兒嗁。今亦呼鮎爲䱱。音蹏(テイ)". In Naoaki Maeno ed. (1975). Sengaikyō retsu sennin den apud Yamaguchi (1995)) (Note: This Guo Pu quote as commentary to Bei Shan Jing is hard to confirm in other secondary sources, but similar phrases about renyu resembling catfish were written by other near-contemporaries, one being "Guangzhi" 廣志 (attributed to Guo Yigong 郭義恭) as preserved in the Shui Jing Zhu: Yi River, cf. commentary to the Hainei bei jing 海内北經 (Classic of regions within the seas: North), by Yuan Ke. Another is Xu Gugang, probably from his Shiji Yinyi or "Pronunciation and Meaning of the Shiji"; both these are quoted in annotations to the Shiji: Books of the First Emperor of Qin, 6, which mentions the human-fish oil used for lanterns in the Emperor's tumulus.) possess four legs, with a voice like baby crying. (Note: Li Shizhen, Bencao Gangmu, (Chapter 44 §42) "Animals with Scales 4": §Tiyu. (Chinese); (English translations); (Japanese tr.).)

Eating the fish purportedly cured idiocy or dementia. This fish as a cure was also quoted in the Compendium of Materia Medica or Bencao Gangmu (1596) under its entry for Tiyu (Chinese: 䱱魚)

The Bencao Gangmu categorized the tiyu (䱱魚) as one of two types of "human-fish" (renyu). The human-fish were also known as "child-fish" or haieryu (孩兒魚; 孩儿鱼).

The other type, called the niyu (鯢魚) is elaborated in a separate section. (Note: Li Shizhen, Bencao Gangmu, (Chapter 44 §43) "Animals with Scales 4": §Niyu. (Chinese); (English translations); (Japanese tr.).) It has been noted by Li Shizhen that the character for the Niyu (Ni 鯢 fish) consists of the "fish" indexing component (魚) and "child" (兒) radical.

Translators of the Bencao Gangmu attempt to match entries with actual taxa of animals, forbs, etc., where possible, and the tiyu type is glossed as "newts" while the niyu type is "Chinese giant salamander".

=== Chiru or red ru fish ===
The chiru or "red ru fish". ― Hu Wenhuan 胡文焕 (fl. 1596–1650). Shanhaijing tu 山海經圖 ("Illustrations to the Classic of Mountains and Seas", 16th century). (Note: A close copy of this woodcut occurs in Wu Renchen's edition of 1667.)

The chiru (赤鱬; "red ru fish". Wade–Giles: ch'ih-ju; "red ju") is described in the Nan Shan Jing ("Classic of the Southern Mountains") as a human-headed fish. It is said to be found in the Qingqushan (青丘山 "Green-Hills Mountains") in the Pool-of-Yi (Yì zhī zé 翼之澤; "Carp-Wings Lake"). It is described as basically fish-form but having a human face, and issuing sounds like the mandarin duck. Eating it purportedly prevented scabies or itchy skin.

The illustration of the chiru from China may have influenced the legless, human-faced fish visualization of some of the ningyo in Japan, according to the hypothesis of Morihiko Fujisawa.

=== Jiaoren ===
The jiaoren (蛟人 "flood dragon people" or 鮫人 "shark people") (Note: Edward H. Schafer also refers to "shark" here being interchangeable with jiao dragon (which he suggests translating as "cockatrice").) (Note: The conception of them seems to have shifted from half-reptilian to half-fish in later periods.) that appear in medieval writings are considered to be references to merfolk.

This mythical southern mermaid or merman is recorded in Ren Fang's Shuyi ji "Records of Strange Things" (early 6th century CE). (Note: Ren Fang, Shuyi Ji, second volume.: "南海中有鮫人室水居如魚不廢機織其眼泣則出珠晉木𤣥虚海賦云天琛水怪鮫人之室" (translation quoted below).)

In the midst of the South Sea are the houses of the kău (Chinese: 鮫; pinyin: jiao; Wade–Giles: chiao) people who dwell in the water like fish, but have not given up weaving at the loom. Their eyes have the power to weep, but what they bring forth is pearls.

Similar passages appear in other texts such as the Bowuzhi (博物志, "Treatise of Manifold " c. 290 CE) as "weep[ing] tears that became pearls". (Note: A 15th-century compilation of quotations from Chinese literature, the Chengyu kao (Chinese: 成語考; "Idioms investigated") merely gives a partial quote from the Bowuzhi as "The mermaid wept tears that became pearls".)

These aquatic people supposedly spun a type of raw silk called jiaoxiao 蛟綃 "mermaid silk" or jiaonujuan 蛟女絹 "mermaid woman's silk". Schafer equates this with sea silk, the rare fabric woven from byssus filaments produced by Pinna "pen shell" mollusks. (Note: Chinese writings claimed that the raw material for such "silk" came from shuiyang 水羊 "water sheep" or shuican 水蠶 "water silkworm" a.k.a. bingcan 冰蠶 "ice silkworm". Cf. sea silk.)

=== Loting ===
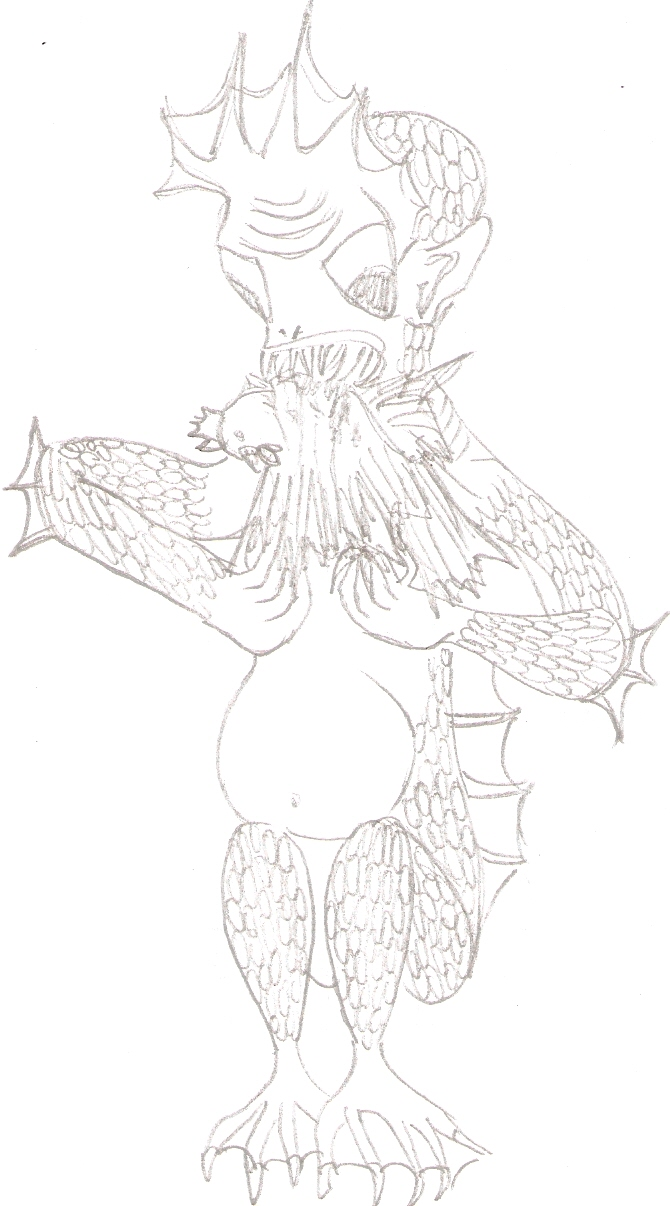
Artist interpretation of Lu Heng fish activity by Author Hwlisc

Loting (盧亭) is a mysterious ethnic group residing in Hong Kong's Myths. They are legendary merfolk half human and half fish, also known as Lo Yu, Lu Heng, or Lo Ting Fish Man. They have lived on Tai O' Lantau Island in Hong Kong since the local civil uprising in the Eastern Jin Dynasty of China. It is said that Loting has fish scales on his fish-like human body, a face that resembles humans, and he enjoys sucking chicken blood. They could use their catch to fish from Tai O and trade chickens with the local human inhabitants to survive.

== Japan ==
The ningyo (人魚; "human-fish") of Japan has its own history in the country's literary record. The earliest references (in the Nihon shoki, entry for year 619, reign of Empress Suiko) do not specifically use the term ningyo, and the "thing" appeared in fresh water (a river in Ōmi Province, canal Settsu Province), and may presumed to be a giant salamander. Later accounts claim that Empress Suiko's regent Prince Shōtoku knew the creature to be a ningyo when one was presented to him by representatives of Ōmi. The appearance of the human-fish was strongly associated with ill omen in later treatments of the Prince's encounter with the human-fish.

During the Kamakura Period, ningyo of the marine sort were frequently reported as washing ashore, and these were taken to be ominous signs usually prefiguring bloody battles.

The ningyo, or rather renyu (人魚) and the like found in Chinese sources (chiru, tiyu etc., etc., discussed above) were also discussed in Japanese literature, for example, works of scholars of herbal and traditional medicine, such as Kaibara Ekiken (d. 1714) and Ono Ranzan (d. 1810). These Japanese scholars were also aware of European discussions on "sirens", "anthropomorphic fish", "peixe muller (fish-woman)", etc.

== In popular culture ==
- Merfolk are a fictional race of humanoids that live underwater in Dungeons & Dragons.
- Merfolk are humanoid aquatic creatures with fish-like characteristics in Magic: The Gathering.
- Merfolk are humanoid aquatic creatures with fish-like characteristics in Spectromancer.
- In One Piece, the Merfolk are among the different races in the anime and one of the two types that dwell underwater (the other being the Fishmen). Each of the Merfolk has their "fish" parts based on different fishes and related creatures like coelacanths, icefish, kissing gouramis, Japanese rice fish, striped beakfish, righteye flounders, olive flounders, blue-striped angelfish, smelt-whitings, sharks, oarfish, opahs, blue-ringed octopuses, shortfin mako sharks, seahorses, catfish, Bering wolffish, goldfish, and brotulas however not all of them are half fish as they have the aquatic parts of other marine creatures from waist down instead like an octopus.
- In Monster Musume, Meroune Lorelei is a mermaid princess wearing gothic lolita clothes who moves around in a wheelchair when she's out of water.
- The Techno Trolls introduced in Trolls World Tour bears a striking resemblance to mermaids but are able to survive and walk on dry land like the other tribes of trolls.

== See also ==
- Mer (disambiguation)
- Naiad, female spirits of Greek mythology
- Nixie, water spirits of Germanic (especially Scandinavian) folklore
- Piscine humanoid
- Rusalka, female spirits of Slavic folklore
