= Merr =

Merr or MERR may refer to:

- Maine Eastern Railroad, former railroad in coastal Maine
- Merr., taxonomic author abbreviation of Elmer Drew Merrill (1876–1956), American botanist and taxonomist

== See also ==
- G.Merr., taxonomic author abbreviation of George Knox Merrill
- Mer (disambiguation)
