= Castel Béranger =

1898 art nouveau apartments in Paris

Coordinates: 48.8524°N 2.2746°E

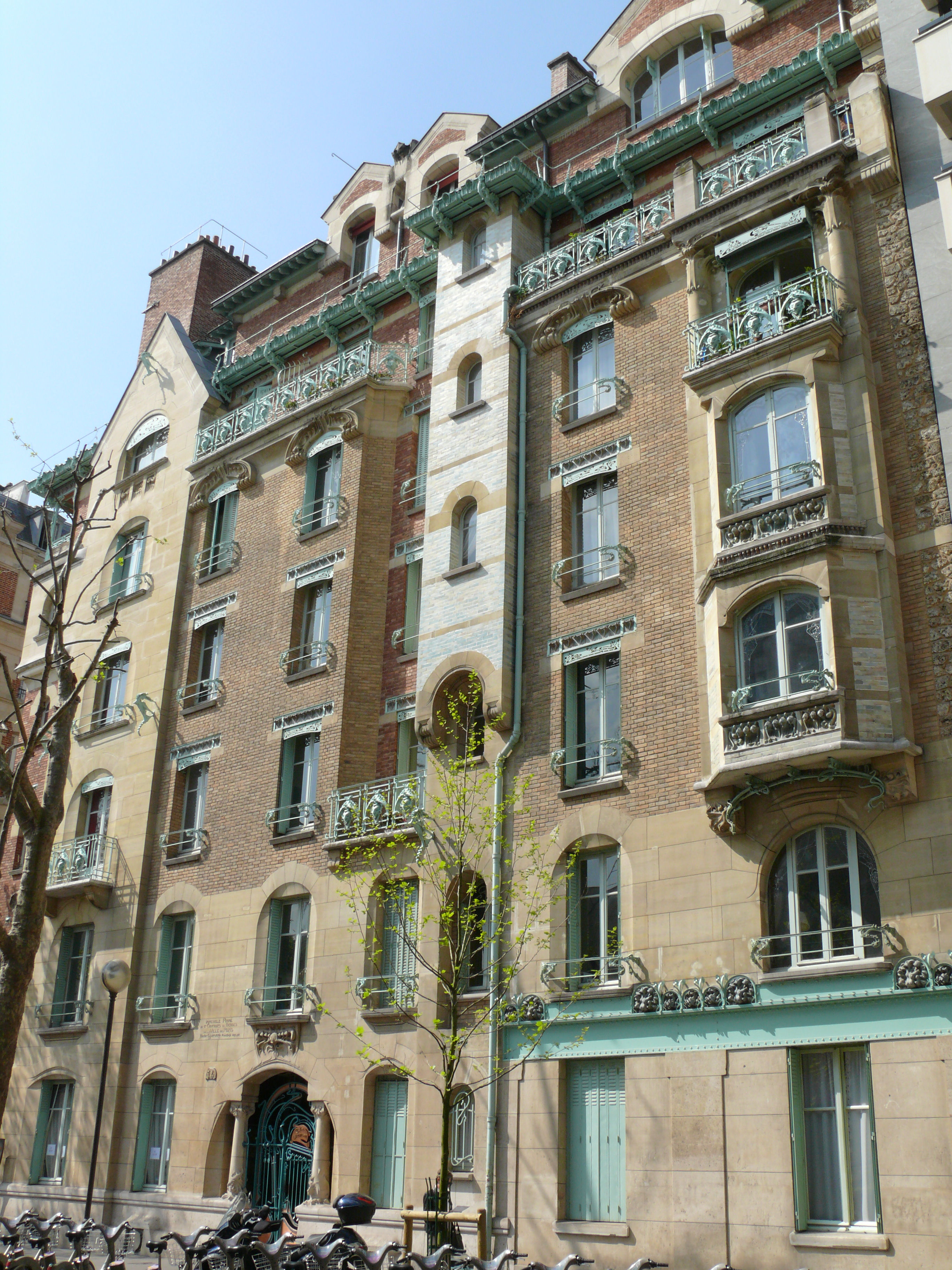
Castel Beranger, the first Art Nouveau apartment building in Paris

The Castel Béranger is a residential building with thirty-six apartments located at 14 rue de la Fontaine in the 16th arrondissement of Paris. It was designed by the architect Hector Guimard, and built between 1895 and 1898. It was the first residence in Paris built in the style known as Art Nouveau.

== History ==
Architect Hector Guimard (1867-1942) was born in Lyon and attended the School of Decorative Arts and the École des Beaux-Arts in Paris. He was in charge of the construction of the Pavilion of Electricity at the 1889 Paris International Exposition, and between 1891 and 1893 he built several private houses and a school in Paris, all in the traditional styles.

In 1894, at the age of twenty-seven, Guimard traveled to England and to Belgium, where he met the Belgian architect Victor Horta, and saw the Hotel Tassel which Horta had built in 1893–94 in what later became known as the Art Nouveau style. It was inspired not by classical models but by nature, particularly by the curving stems of plants and flowers. Horta also stressed to Guimard the importance of unity in a building; the structure, decoration, furniture, wallpaper, carpets and decoration should all go together.

Guimard had undertaken the project of designing an apartment building in a traditional style for a widow named Madame Fournier before he went to Brussels and met Horta. When he returned, he persuaded his client to allow him to build the structure in the new style. He began designing the Castel Béranger in 1895, Guimard became involved in every detail of the project, designing the furniture, ornamental ironwork, carpets, glass, wall paper, door locks and doorknobs.

Guimard did not forget his debt to Horta; when the building was done, Guimard sent him an album of the designs of the building with the inscription, "to an eminent master and friend, Victor Horta, affectionate homage from an admirer."

== The design ==
Describing the Castel Béranger, the architectural historian and critic Simon Texier wrote: "The Art Nouveau had as its characteristic trait a naturalist approach, which made a building or a simple object into a work which was at the same time complex, in motion, and unified by its lines."

There were many elements of the new building that were neo-Gothic, though Guimard's interpretation was very far from the pure 13th century style advocated by Viollet-le-Duc. It was suggested by the name Castel, rather than Hotel, and by its modern version of echauguettes, the overhanging turrets that were a feature on the corners of medieval castles.

Guimard put into the building a multiplicity of different forms, materials and colors, some of them inspired by the colors of the villas of seaside towns. The ornament was abundant, but carefully designed and not overwhelming; it moved away from Gothic into a more personal and original style. The interior decoration was also diverse and personal.

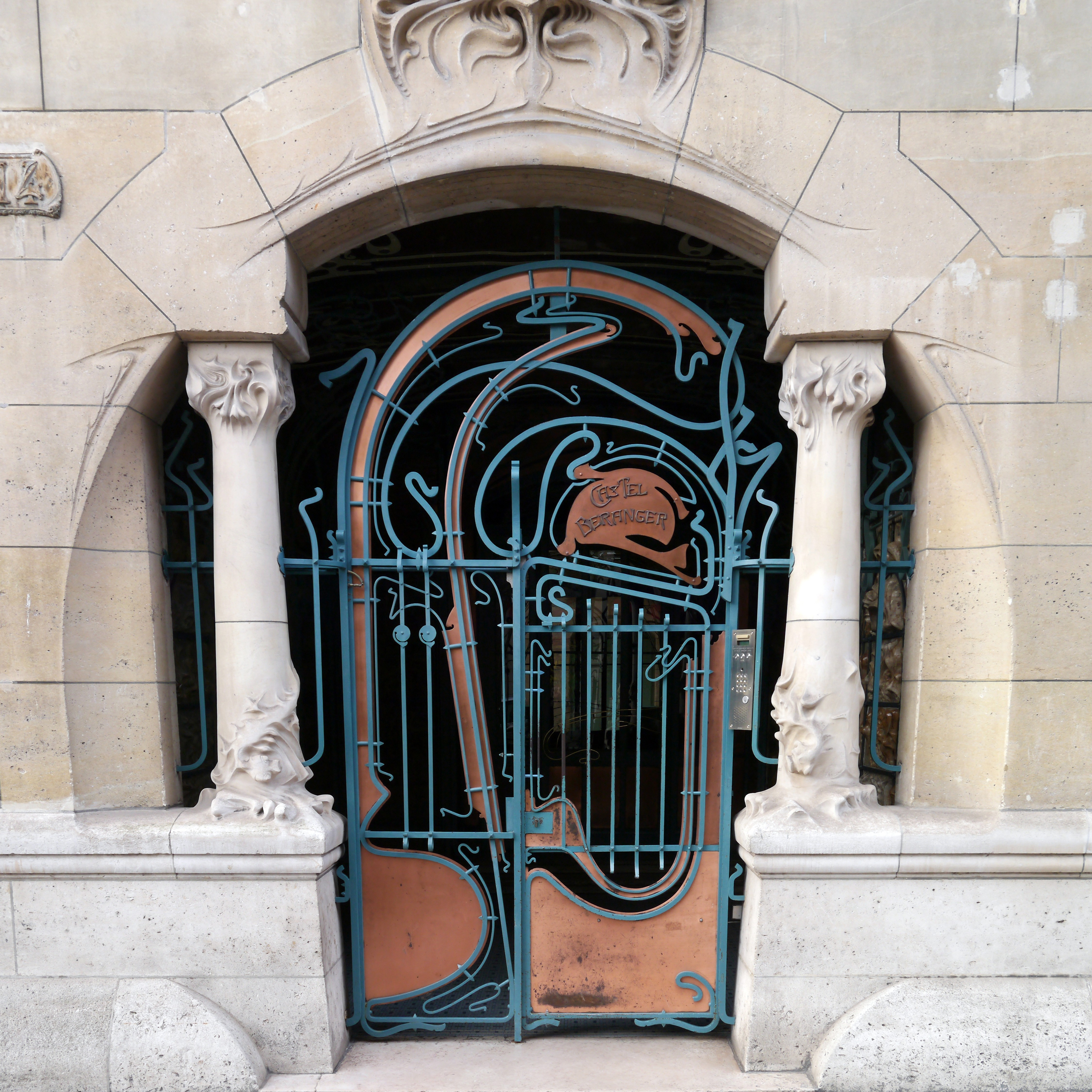
Gateway

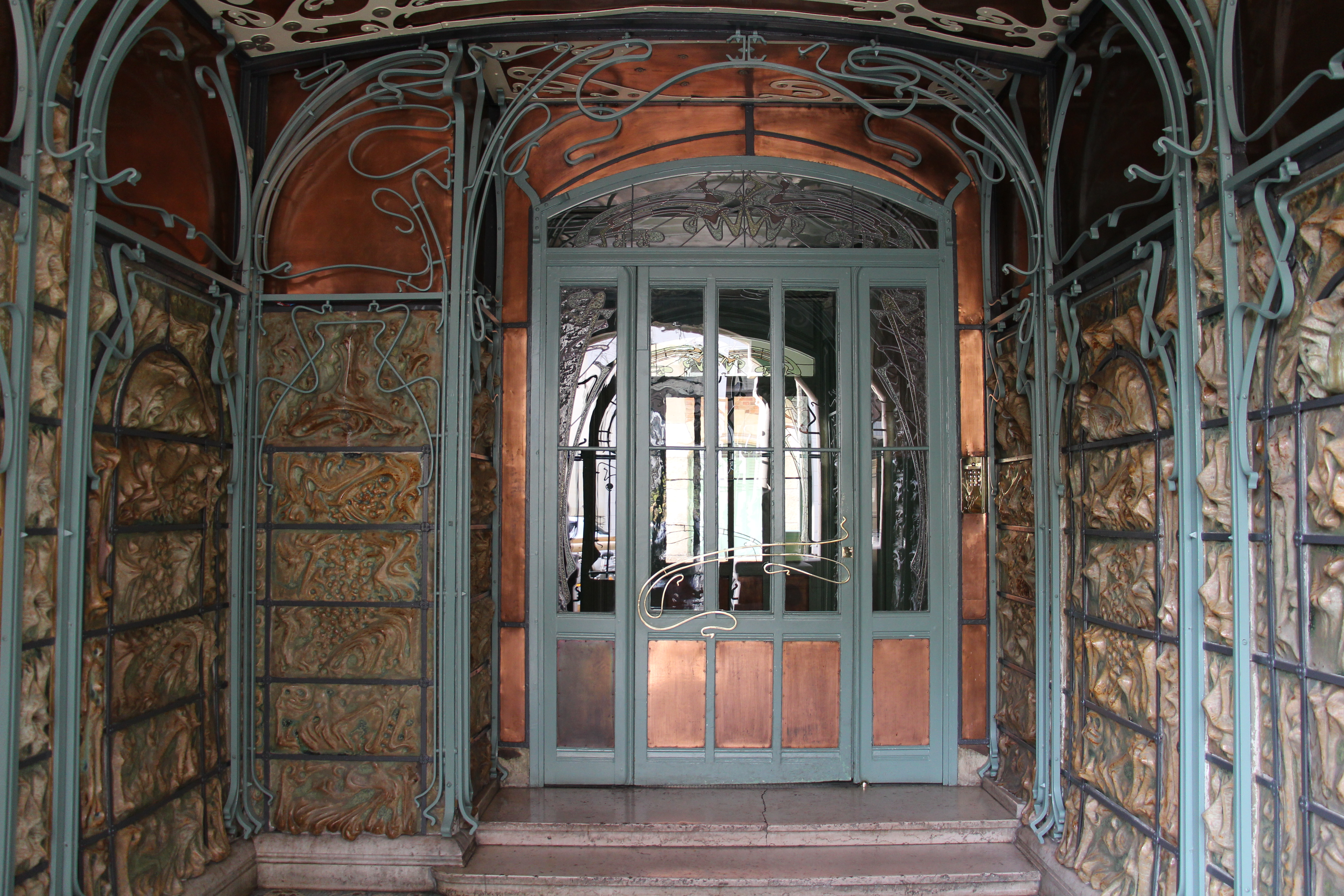
Breezeway, with wall plates by Alexandre Bigot

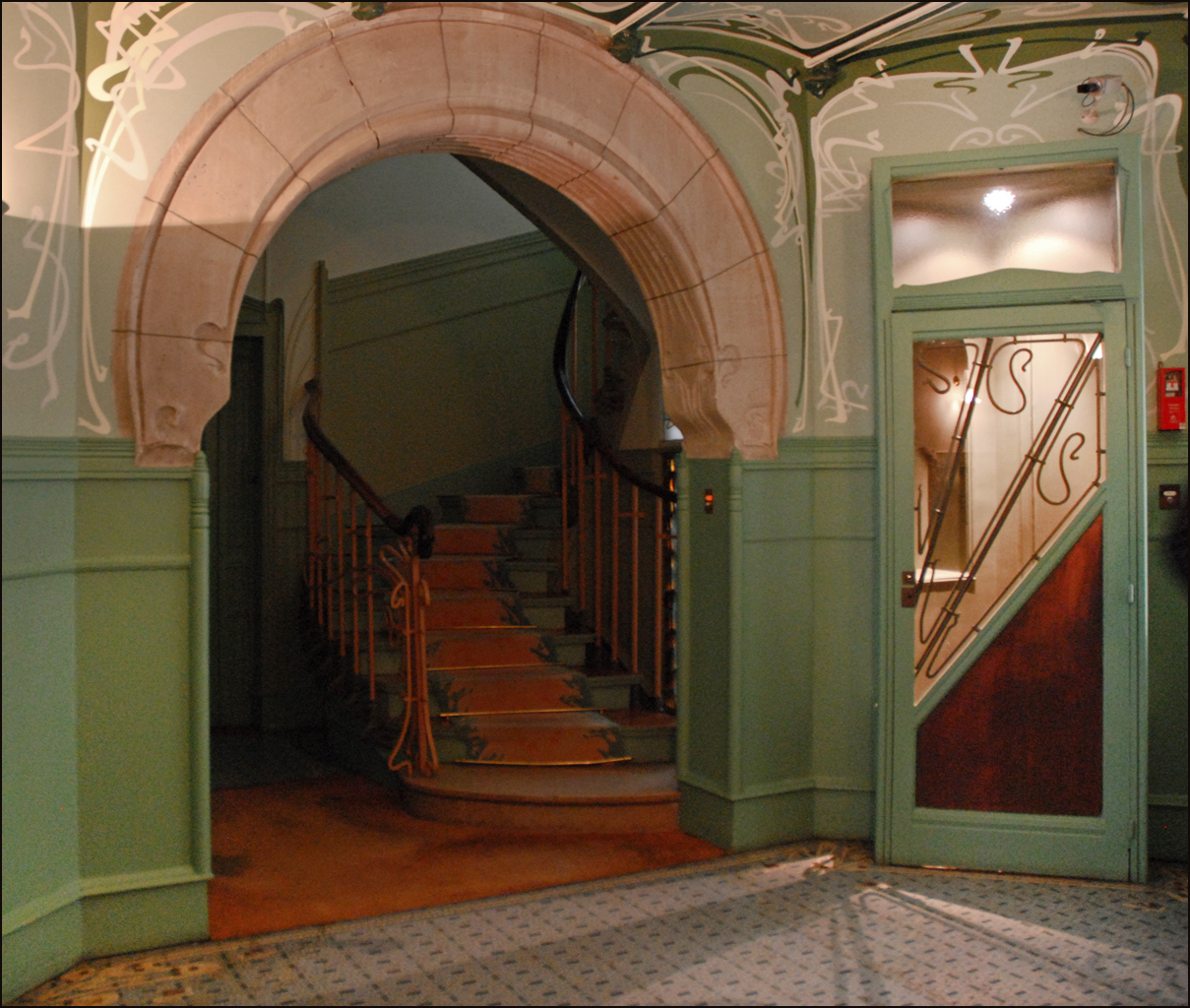
The vestibule

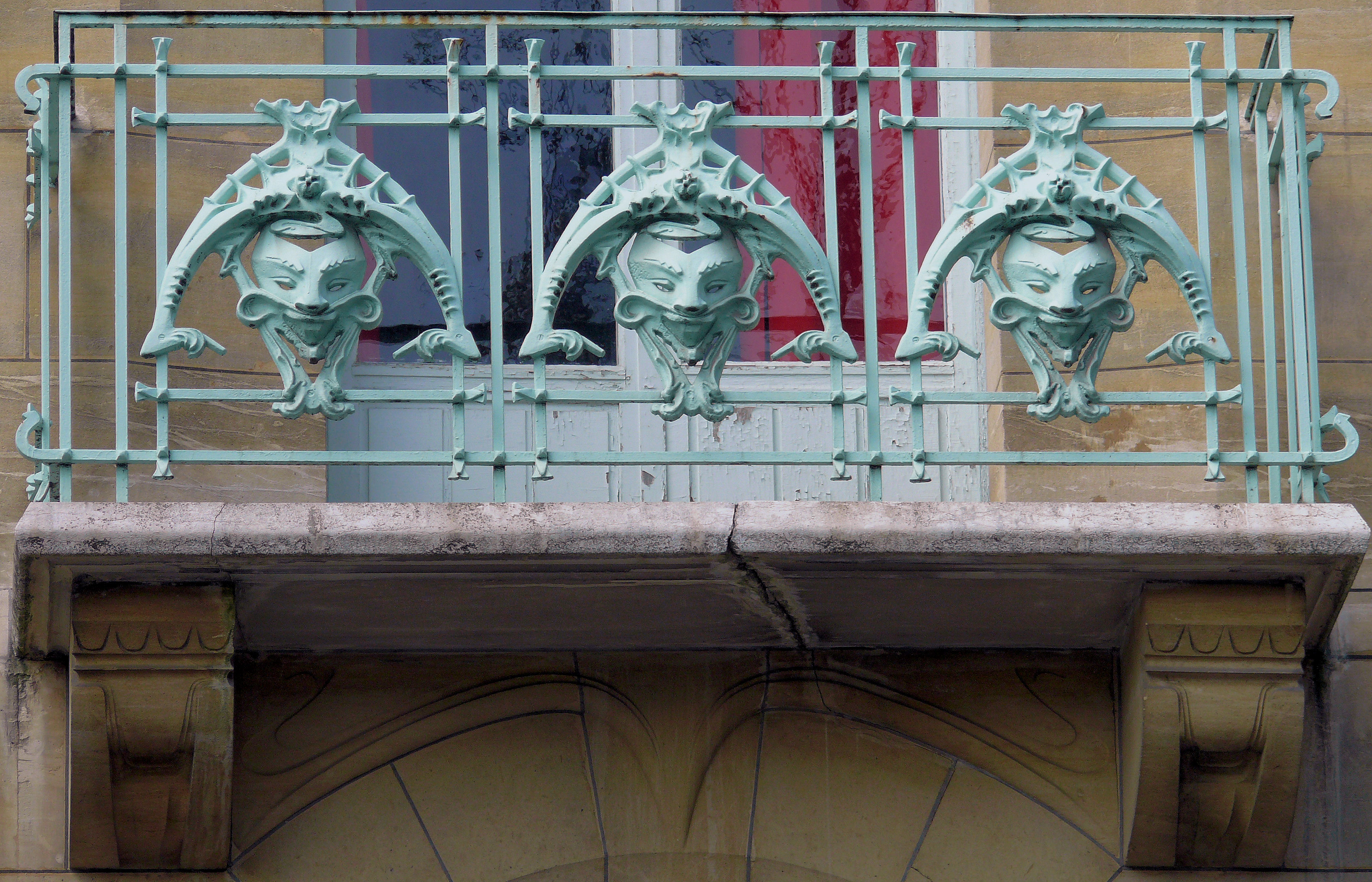
Balcony decoration

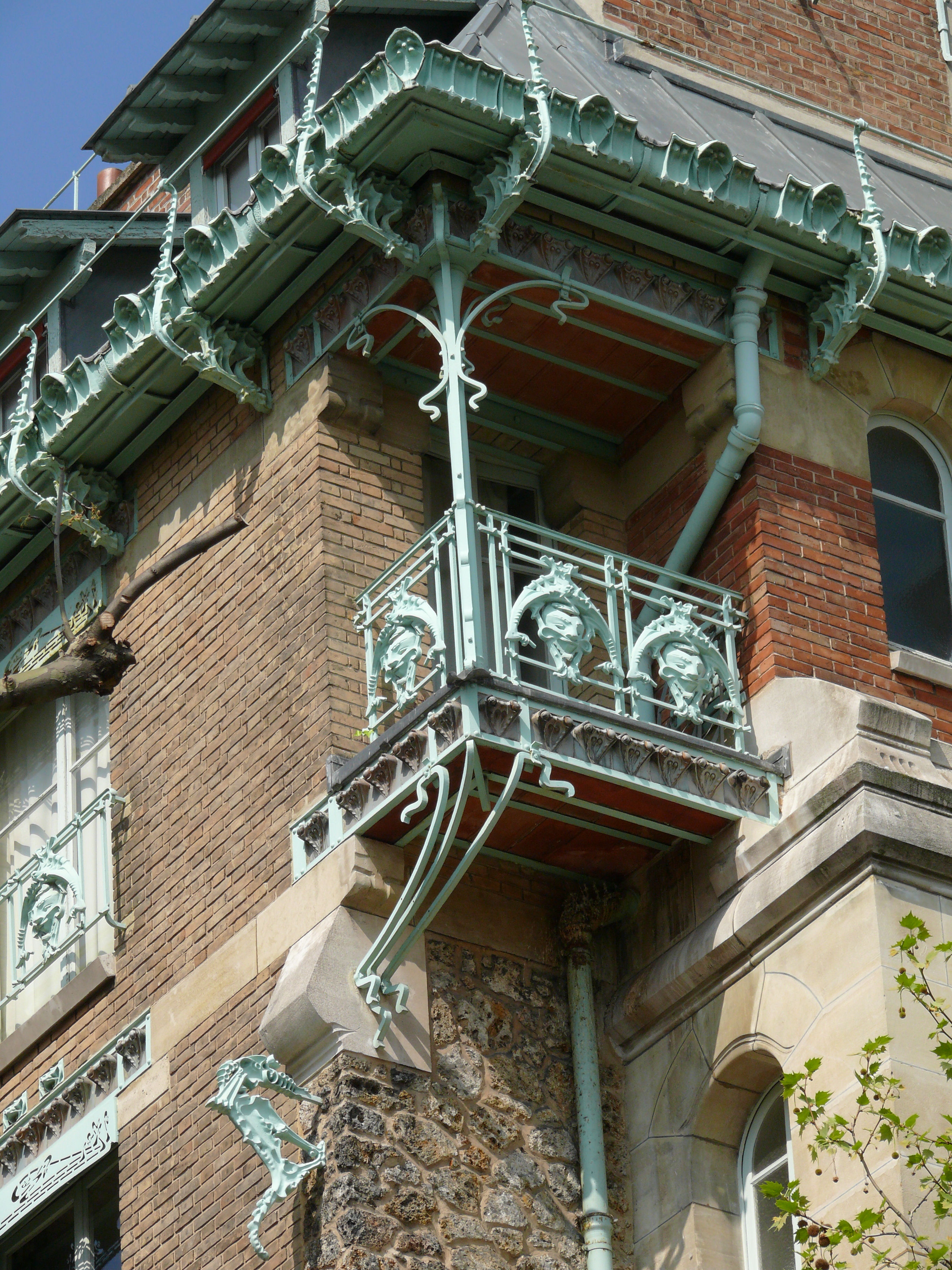
Corner detail

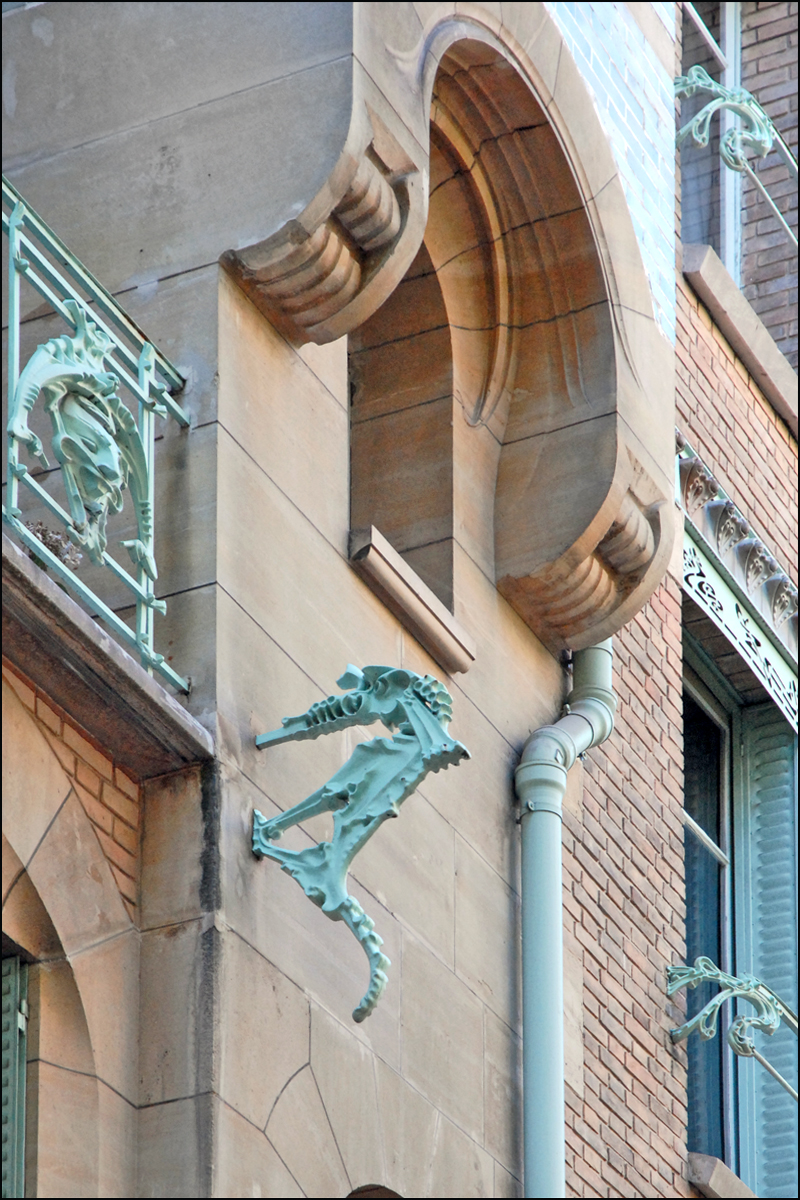
Exterior decoration

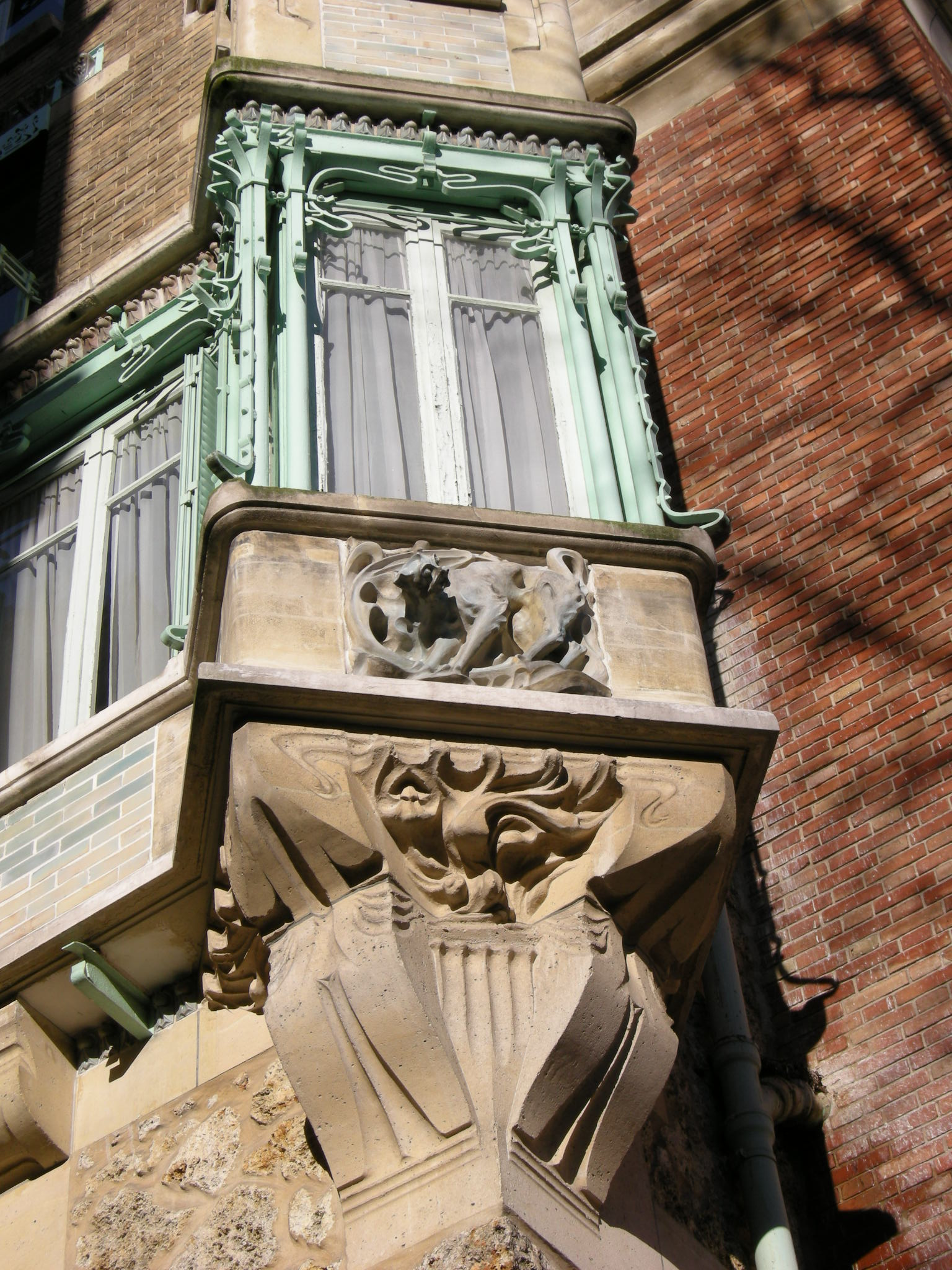
Window decoration

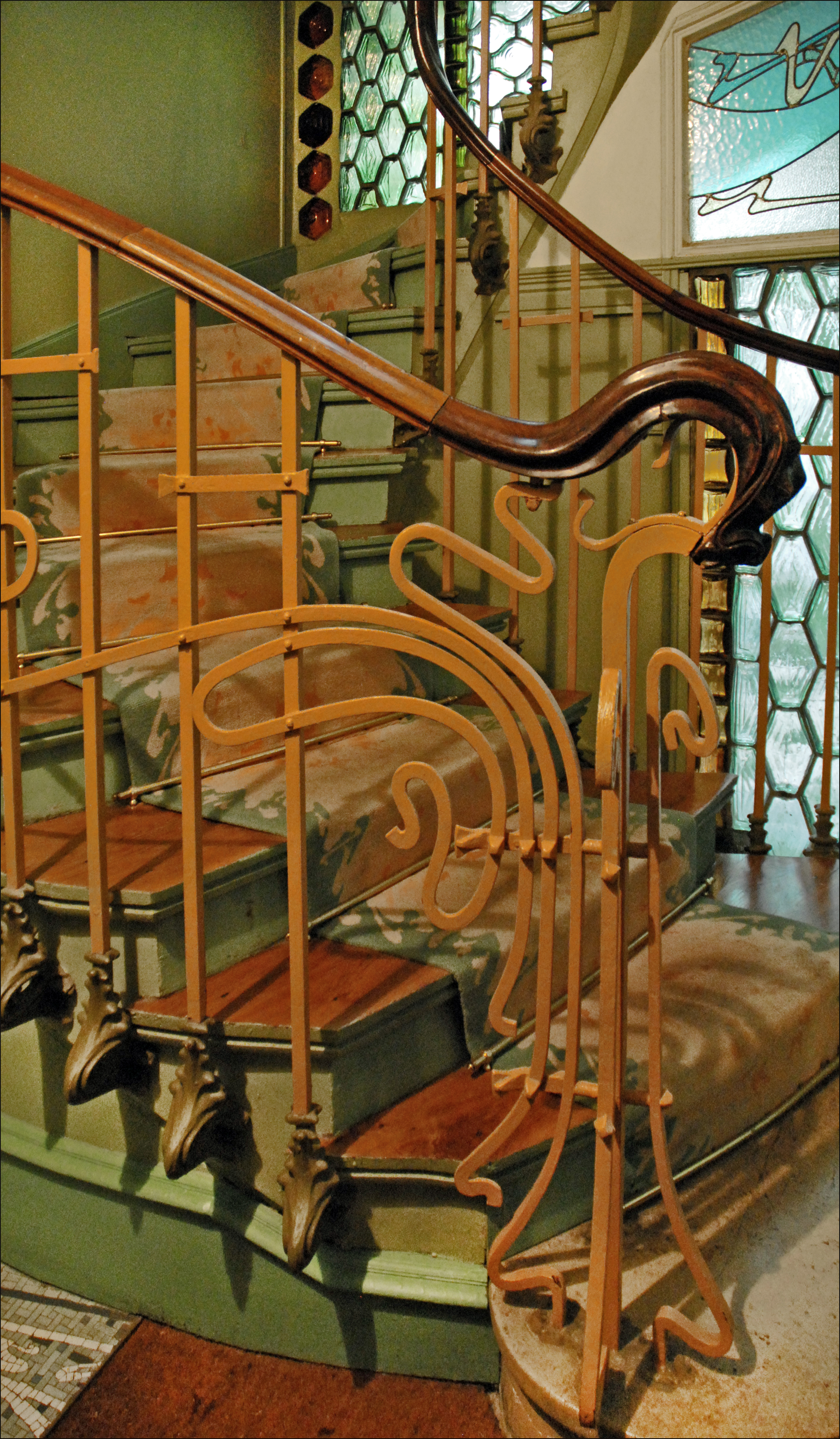
Detail of main stairway

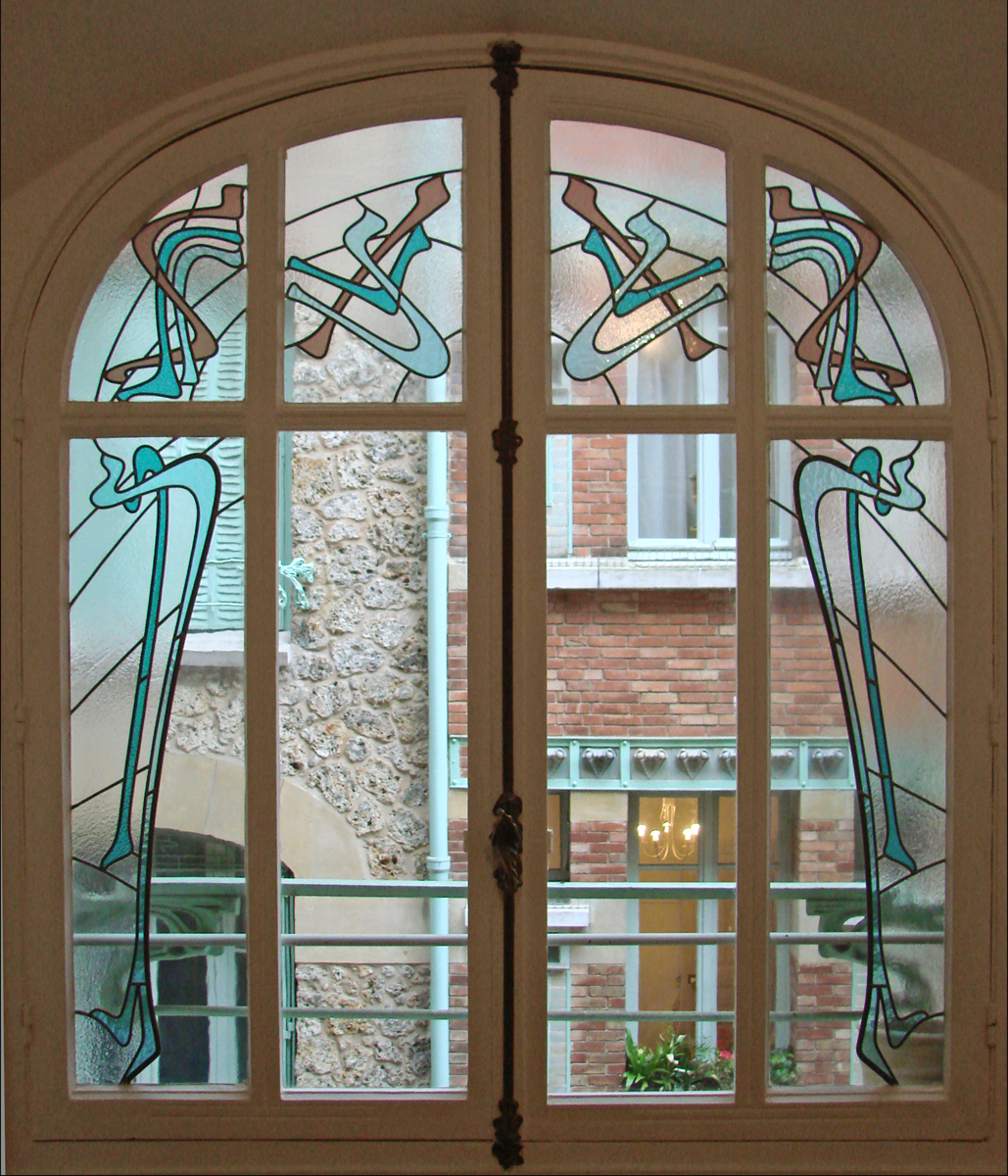
Window facing the courtyard

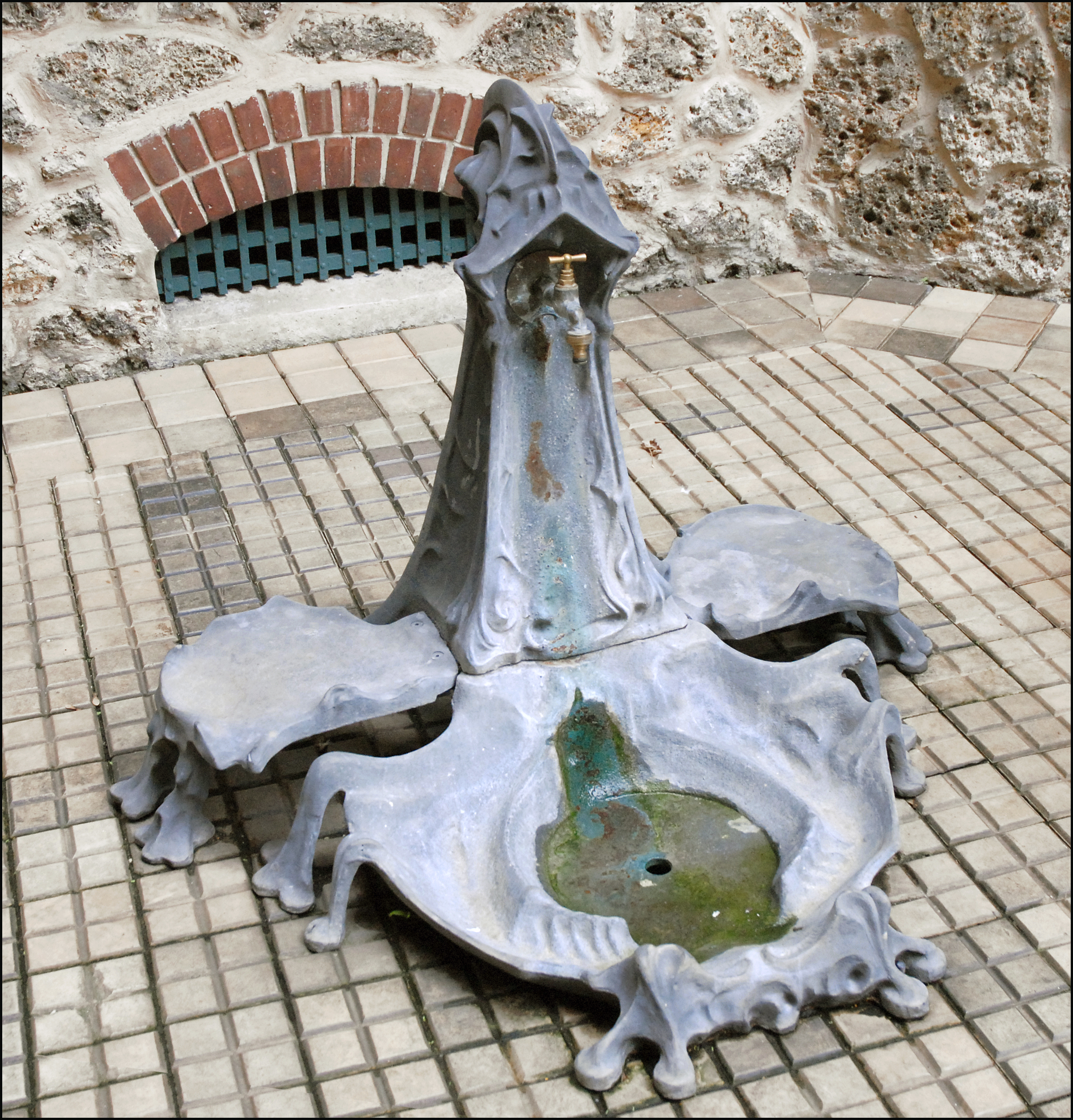
Fountain in the interior courtyard

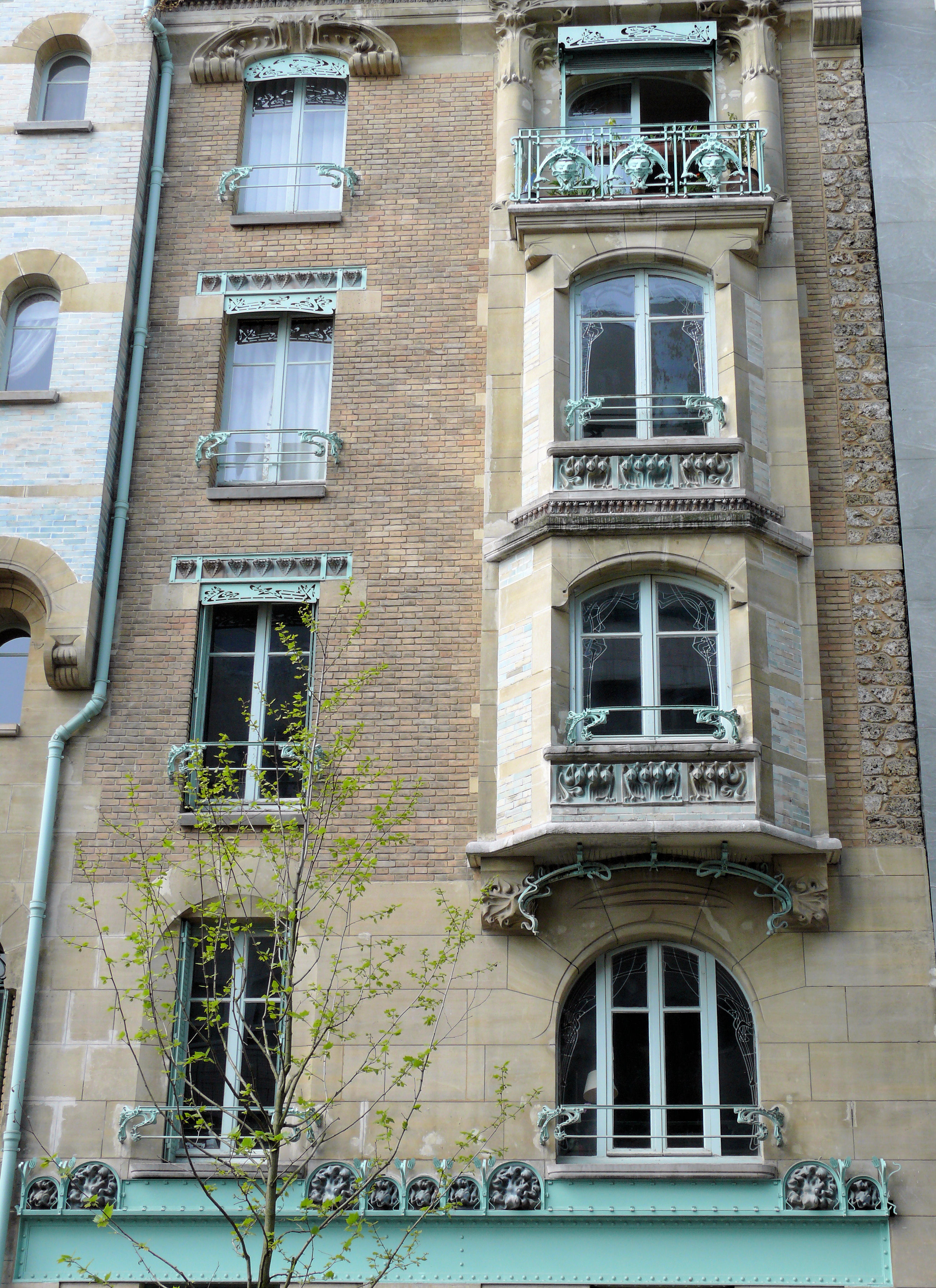
Facade detail

== The Paris facade competition ==
In the late 1890s, there was growing criticism of the identical facades of the buildings along the Paris boulevards built during the Second Empire of Napoleon III and his prefect of the Seine, Georges-Eugène Haussmann; they were described as monotonous and boring. In 1898 the City government encouraged variety by organizing a competition the most beautiful and original new building facades (the Concours de façades de la ville de Paris). The winner for the 16th arrondissement was Guimard's Castel Béranger. In the same year, Guimard was selected to design the entrances of the new stations of the Paris Metro, making him the most prominent figure in the French Art Nouveau.

Guimard also took the step, unusual at the time, of launching a public relations campaign based on the building, promoting the new style as a step forward. It was the first time that an architect treated a simple residential building as a major work; in the 20th century this became one of the characteristics of the modernist revolution in architecture.

== Afterwards ==
Guimard built one other Art Nouveau house in Paris; his own residence, the Hotel Guimard, between 1909 and 1913, at 122 Avenue Mozart. For his own house, he moved away from ornament and expressed the Art Nouveau idea of modeling after nature in the form of the building itself. Beside the Metro station, Guimard's other Paris works included a Theater/Concert Hall, the Salle Humbert de Romans, which was opened in 1901 and demolished in 1905, and the Synagogue on Rue Pave in the Marais (1913).

Between World War I and World War II Guimard turned his attention to experiments in building houses with prefabricated materials, including bricks of molded concrete, covered with a glaze (enduit) molded metal windowframes, and a roof covered with zinc. In 1922 he built a house on square Jasmin with these materials. In 1930 he designed a country house, la Guimardiere, where the pipes for the plumbing became a decorative element, featured on the outside, a precursor of the Centre Pompidou. It was demolished in 1969. As World War II approached, he left France and died in New York in 1942.

Nearly all of his Metro stations were removed, and he was nearly forgotten as an architect until the 1970s, when there was renewed interest in the Art Nouveau. The Castel Béranger was classified as an historical monument on 3 July 1972.

== See also ==
- Art Nouveau
- Paris architecture of the Belle Époque
- Concours de façades de la ville de Paris
