= Merfolk (disambiguation) =

Merfolk or merpeople are legendary water-dwelling human-like beings.

Merfolk may also refer to:

- Mer (community), an ethnic group of Gujarat, India
- MerPeople, a 2023 documentary miniseries
