= Mer language (disambiguation) =

The Mer language is a Papuan language of Western New Guinea.

There are several other languages or dialects called Mer:

- Mer, a dialect of the Bench language of Ethiopia
- Meriam language, a Papuan language of Torres Strait

== See also ==
- mer, the ISO 639-3 code for the Meru language
