= La mer =

La mer may refer to:

- La mer (Debussy), an orchestral composition by Claude Debussy
- "La Mer" (song), a 1946 song by Charles Trenet
- La Mer (horse), (born 1973) a champion racehorse
- La Mer (film), an 1895 film directed by Louis Lumière
- La Mer, a brand of cosmetics owned by the Estée Lauder Companies
- "La Mer", a song on The Fragile (Nine Inch Nails album)
