= Mercury transporter =

Transporter MerF
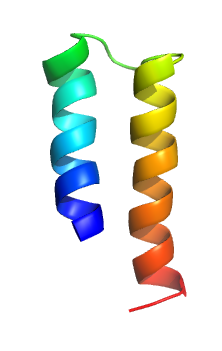
- structure of MerF. It has two trans-membrane helices. PDB 2h3o.

Identifiers
- Symbol: MerF
- Pfam: PF11431
- InterPro: IPR021091
- TCDB: 1.A.72
- OPM superfamily: 218
- OPM protein: 2lj2
Available protein structures:
- PDB: IPR021091 PF11431 (ECOD; PDBsum)
- AlphaFold: IPR021091; PF11431

The mercury transporter superfamily (TC# 1.A.72) is a family of transmembrane bacterial transporters of mercury ions. The common origin of all Mer superfamily members has been established. The common elements between family members are included in TMSs 1-2. A representative list of the subfamilies and proteins that belong to those subfamilies is available in the Transporter Classification Database.

== Subfamilies ==
- 1.A.72.1: The MerF Mercuric Ion (Hg²⁺) Uptake (MerF) Family
- 1.A.72.2: The MerH Mercuric Ion (Hg²⁺) Permease (MerH) Family
- 1.A.72.3: The MerTP Mercuric Ion (Hg²⁺) Permease (MerTP) Family
- 1.A.72.4: The MerC Mercuric Ion (Hg²⁺) Permease (MerC) Family
- 1.A.72.5: The MerE Mercuric Ion (Hg²⁺) Permease (MerE) Family

== Transport Reaction ==
The transport reaction catalyzed by Mer Superfamily members is:

Hg^{2+} or methyl-Hg^{2+} (out) → Hg^{2+} or methyl-Hg^{2+} (in)

== MerF ==
The MerF protein encoded on plasmid pMER327/419 is an 81 residue polypeptide with two putative TMSs. It catalyzes uptake of Hg^{2+} in preparation for reduction by mercuric reductase. The MerF gene is found on mercury resistant plasmids from many gram-negative bacteria, but the sequence of the protein from these plasmids is the same. Limited sequence similarity is shown with the first two TMSs of MerT (TC# 1.A.72.3) and MerC (TC# 1.A.72.4). MerF has two vicinal pairs of cysteine residues which are involved in the transport of Hg(II) across the membrane and are exposed to the cytoplasm. Some members of the MerF family have been designated MerH.

=== Crystal structures ===
PDB: 1WAZ, 2H3O, 2LJ2, 2M67, 2MOZ

== MerTP ==
The MerTP permeases catalyze uptake into bacterial cells of Hg^{2+} in preparation for its reduction by the MerA mercuric reductase. The Hg^{o} produced by MerA is volatile and passively diffuses out of the cell. The merT and merP genes are found on mercury resistance plasmids and transposons of gram-negative and gram-positive bacteria but are also chromosomally encoded in some bacteria. MerT consists of about 130 amino acids and has 3 transmembrane helical segments. Operon analyses have been reported.

== MerP ==
MerP is a periplasmic Hg^{2+}-binding receptor of about 70-80 amino acyl residues, synthesized with a cleavable N-terminal leader. It is homologous to the N-terminal heavy metal binding domains of the copper-and cadmium-transporting P-type ATPases. The 3-D structure of MerP from Ralstonia metallidurans has been solved to 2 Å resolution (PDB: 1OSD). It is 91 amino acyl residues (aas) long with its leader sequence, is monomeric, and binds a single Hg^{2+} ion. Hg^{2+} is bound to a sequence GMTCXXC found in metallochaperones as well as metal-transporting ATPases. The fold is βαββαβ, called the ''ferridoxin-like fold''.

== MerT ==
MerT homologues have been identified in which the 3 TMS MerT is fused to a MerP ''heavy metal associated'' (HMA) domain, possibly via a linker region that includes a fourth TMS (see 1.A.72.3.3). HMA domains of ~30 aas are found in MerP, copper chaperone proteins, mercuric reductase, and at the N-termini of both copper and heavy metal P-type ATPases, sometimes in multiple copies.

== MerC ==
The MerC protein encoded on the IncJ plasmid pMERPH of the Shewanella putrefaciens mercuric resistance operon is 137 amino acids in length and possesses four putative transmembrane α-helical spanners (TMSs). It has been shown to bind and take up Hg^{2+} ions. merC genes are encoded on several plasmids of gram-negative bacteria and may also be chromosomally encoded. MerC proteins are homologous to other bacterial Hg^{2+} bacterial transporters.

== MerE ==
See Kiyono, Masako; Sone, Yuka; Nakamura, Ryosuke; Pan-Hou, Hidemitsu; Sakabe, Kou (2009-04-02). "The MerE protein encoded by transposon Tn21 is a broad mercury transporter in Escherichia coli". FEBS Letters. 583 (7): 1127–1131. Bibcode:2009FEBSL.583.1127K. doi:10.1016/j.febslet.2009.02.039. ISSN 1873-3468. PMID 19265693. S2CID 27100434.
