= Mer, Loir-et-Cher =

Mer
- Commune
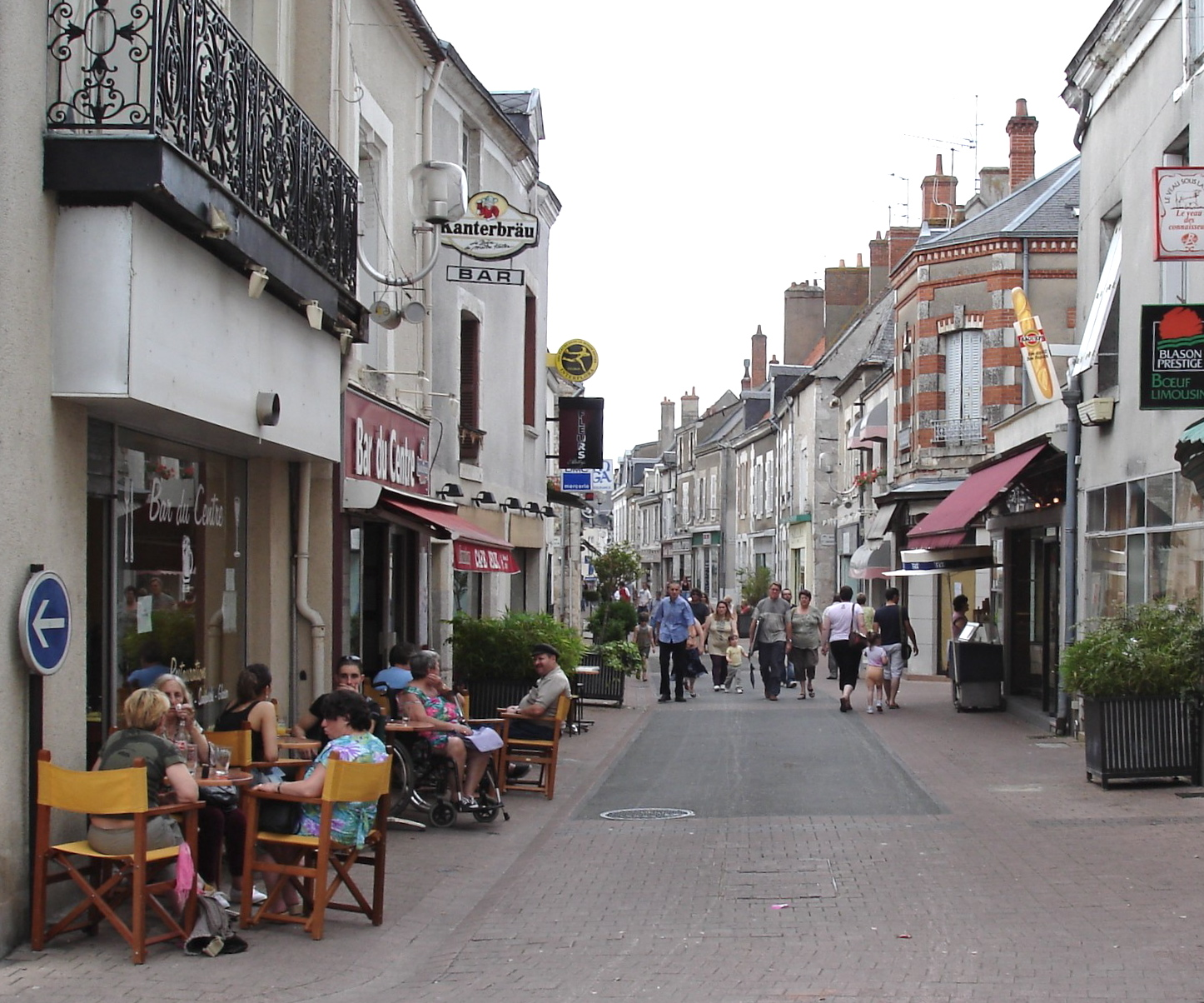

- Coat of arms
- Location of Mer
- Location within France Location within Centre-Val de Loire
- Coordinates: 47°41′57″N 1°30′30″E
- Country: France
- Region: Centre-Val de Loire
- Department: Loir-et-Cher
- Arrondissement: Blois
- Canton: La Beauce
- Intercommunality: Beauce Val de Loire

Government
  - Mayor (2020–2026): Vincent Robin
- Area^{1}: 26.47 km^{2} (10.22 sq mi)
- Elevation: 98 m (322 ft)
- Highest elevation: 116 m (381 ft)
- Lowest elevation: 72 m (236 ft)
- Population (2023): 6,250
  - Density: 236/km^{2} (612/sq mi)
- Time zone: UTC+01:00 (CET)
  - Summer (DST): UTC+02:00 (CEST)
- INSEE/Postal code: 41136 /41500
- ^{1} French Land Register data, which excludes lakes, ponds, glaciers > 1 km^{2} (0.386 sq mi or 247 acres) and river estuaries.

Mer (French pronunciation: [mɛʁ]), also known as Mer-sur-Loire (pronounced [mɛʁ syʁ lwaʁ]; lit. 'Sea on Loire') for clarity, is a commune in the Loir-et-Cher department, region of Centre-Val de Loire, France.

== Population ==
Historical population

Year	Pop.	±% p.a.
1793	4,500	—
1800	3,507	−3.50%
1806	4,020	+2.30%
1821	3,531	−0.86%
1831	3,733	+0.56%
1836	3,878	+0.77%
1841	3,686	−1.01%
1846	3,900	+1.14%
1851	4,233	+1.65%
1856	3,965	−1.30%
1861	4,166	+0.99%
1866	4,269	+0.49%
1872	4,058	−0.84%
1876	4,021	−0.23%
1881	4,029	+0.04%
1886	4,046	+0.08%
1891	4,029	−0.08%
1896	3,797	−1.18%
1901	3,585	−1.14%

Year	Pop.	±% p.a.
1906	3,595	+0.06%
1911	3,578	−0.09%
1921	3,223	−1.04%
1926	3,165	−0.36%
1931	2,912	−1.65%
1936	2,746	−1.17%
1946	2,821	+0.27%
1954	3,055	+1.00%
1962	3,477	+1.63%
1968	4,600	+4.78%
1975	5,158	+1.65%
1982	5,886	+1.90%
1990	5,950	+0.14%
1999	5,884	−0.12%
2007	5,844	−0.09%
2012	6,202	+1.20%
2017	6,238	+0.12%
2023	6,250	+0.03%

Source: EHESS and INSEE (1968-2023)

== See also ==
- Communes of the Loir-et-Cher department
