= La Bourdonnaye family =

Noble French family of Breton origin

de La Bourdonnaye
- Noble family
- Gules, three pilgrim's staffs (bourdons) argent
- Place of origin: Duchy of Brittany
- Founded: 15th century (noble extraction proven to 1427)
- Historic seat: Château de la Bourdonnaye; Hôtel de Blossac; Château de Blossac
- Titles: Titles and offices: Marquess of La Bourdonnaye (1717); Count of Blossac; Baron of the Empire; Peer of France; Senator of Maine-et-Loire; Deputy of Maine-et-Loire; Intendant; Président à mortier of the Parlement of Brittany
- Members: General; Maréchal de camp; Rector; Mayor of Rennes; Mayor of Carentoir
- Distinctions: Order of Saint Michael; Maintenue de noblesse (1668)
- Traditions: Duchy of Brittany; Kingdom of France
- Motto: Pro aris et focis (For altar and hearth)
- Cadet branches: La Bourdonnaye; La Bourdonnaye-Blossac

The La Bourdonnaye family is an extant family of the French nobility of "ancient extraction" (noblesse d'ancienne extraction), with proof of nobility dating back to 1427. The family originated in Brittany.

Under the Ancien Régime, the family primarily held positions in the judiciary and royal administration. Its members include knights of the Order of Saint Michael, a bishop, several general officers, a deputy during the Bourbon Restoration who served as a minister to King Charles X, a mayor of Rennes, and various other deputies.

== Surname ==
This family should not be confused with the Mahé de La Bourdonnais family, which is a separate line of the French nobility.

== History ==
The La Bourdonnaye family originated from the lordship of La Bourdonnais in Trégomar, in the Côtes-d'Armor department of France. It later established roots in the parish of Gévezé, near Rennes.

The two currently existing branches descend from Bertrand IV de la Bourdonnaye (1395–1469).

The senior branch, de La Bourdonnaye, descends from Jehan I (the elder), born in 1420 and died in 1480. He was succeeded by Jehan II (1445), Jehan III (1470), François-Louis (1500), Alain (1530), and Nicolas (1565). This lineage continued in Gévezé without achieving the same prominence as the cadet branch.

The cadet branch descends from Olivier II (the younger), born in 1425 and died in 1479. From this branch come two sub-branches with a common ancestor: Julien de La Bourdonnaye, esquire and Lord of Couettion, Bratz, Le Mottay, La Loherie, Le Boisguérin, and Héréal. He married Claude de Kerguizec on 5 April 1562, and their sons were:

- Gilles, "Viscount of Couettion", a knight of the Order of Saint-Michel. He was the father of Charles de La Bourdonnaye (married 1622 to Yvonne du Bouëxic), whose son Louis (1627–1699), a counselor at the Parlement of Brittany, founded the current senior branch of La Bourdonnaye-Blossac.
- Jean, ancestor of the Lords of Liré and Coëtcandec, who constitute the current cadet branch of La Bourdonnaye.

== Lineage ==
The lineage is considered established from Guillaume II de La Bourdonnaye, esquire. He was the father of Robin de La Bourdonnaye, who built the Château de La Bourdonnaye in the parish of Gévezé and married Jeanne de la Chapelle of the House of Molac.

The proven lineage traces back to his grandson: Bertrand de la Bourdonnaye, Lord of Valmarquer, living in 1427, who married Anne de Boisguéhenneuc. They had two sons: Jean, the elder, founder of the senior branch of La Bourdonnaye (married to Jeanne de Bezit), and Olivier, founder of the cadet branch of Couettion (married to Marguerite Rabet).

The La Bourdonnaye family is listed in the catalogue of French nobility with the following arms: Gules, three pilgrim's staffs (bourdons) argent, placed in pale, two and one. They are noted for ancient extraction (1427), the Honours of the Court, and the title of Marquis granted in 1717. The family has been a member of the Association d'entraide de la noblesse française (ANF, Mutual aid association of the French nobility) since 1948. Louis de La Bourdonnaye, "Count of Blossac" (1627–1699), a counselor at the Parlement of Brittany, was maintained as a noble of ancient extraction in Brittany on 21 October 1668. The lands and lordships of Couettion, La Gassilli, and Bouexières in Carentoir were united and erected into a marquisate under the name La Bourdonnaye by letters patent in February 1717. These were registered in Nantes on 7 February 1718, in favor of Yves de La Bourdonnaye, a Councilor of State.

== Notable members ==
The following individuals are notable members of the family, spanning roles from religious leaders to military officers and politicians:

- Louis de La Bourdonnaye (1627–1699), counselor at the Parlement of Brittany.
- Yves Marie de La Bourdonnaye (1653–1726), Intendant of Poitiers, Rouen, Bordeaux, and Orléans.
- Jacques-Renaud de La Bourdonnaye (1660–1724), président à mortier at the Parlement of Brittany.
- Jean Louis de La Bourdonnaye (1667–1745), Bishop of Léon.
- Louis Gabriel de La Bourdonnaye (1691–1729), président à mortier at the Parlement of Brittany.
- Louis François de La Bourdonnaye (1700–1777), Intendant of Rouen.
- Paul Esprit Marie de La Bourdonnaye (1716–1800), Intendant of Poitiers.
- Anne Marie Charles de La Bourdonnaye (1726–1758), naval officer.
- Anne François Augustin de La Bourdonnaye (1747–1793), general.
- Esprit Charles Clair de La Bourdonnaye (1752–1829), Maréchal de camp and Mayor of Rennes.
- Charles Esprit Marie de La Bourdonnaye (1753–1840), Peer of France during the Restoration.
- Charles Olivier Marie Sévère de La Bourdonnaye (1766–1859), Chouan officer and deputy.
- François-Régis de La Bourdonnaye (1767–1839), deputy and Minister of the Interior under Charles X.
- Arthur Charles Esprit de La Bourdonnaye (1785–1844), maréchal de camp and deputy.
- Marie Ferdinand Raoul de La Bourdonnaye (1837–1911), deputy.
- Yves de La Bourdonnaye (1919–2010), Grand Officer of the Legion of Honour, captain and mercenary in Katanga.
- Geoffroy de la Bourdonnaye (1921–1945), officer of the Free French Forces.
- Guy de la Bourdonnaye (1925–1945), member of the French Resistance.
- Armel de La Bourdonnaye (born 1963), former director of the École des Ponts ParisTech, rector of the Academy of Poitiers, and director of INSA Hauts-de-France.
- Gilles de La Bourdonnaye (born 1973), para table tennis player.

== Gallery ==
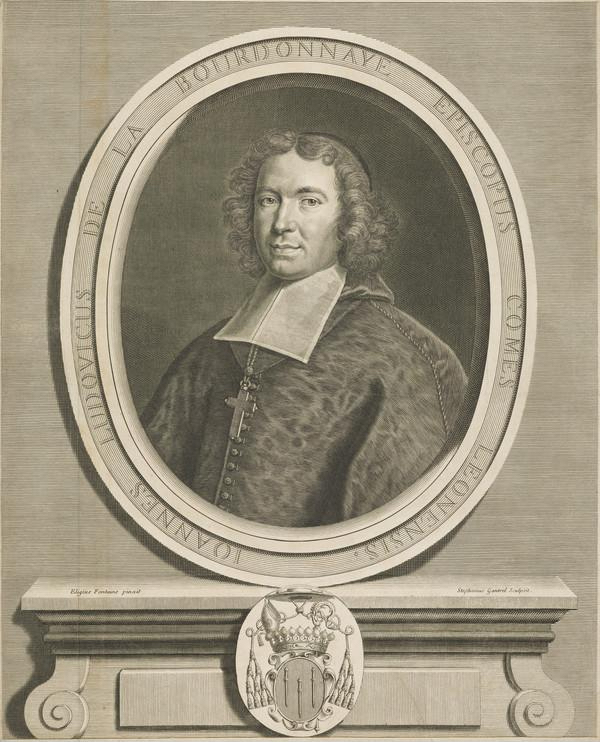
Jean Louis de La Bourdonnaye (1667–1745), Bishop of Léon

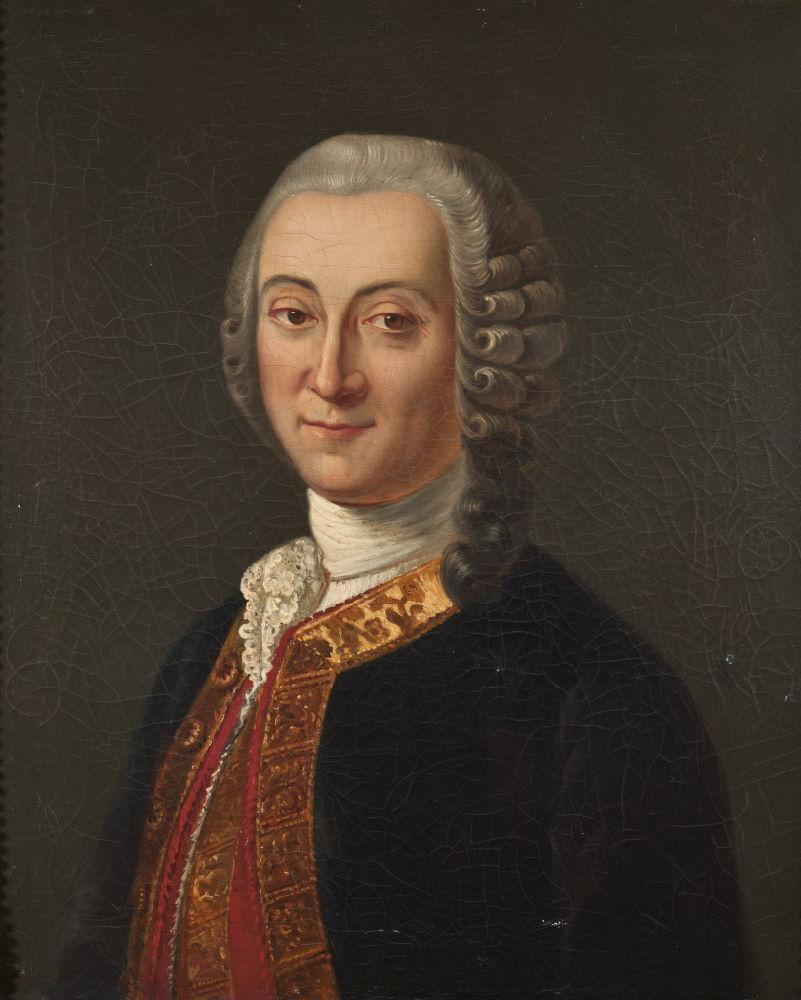
Paul Esprit Marie de La Bourdonnaye (1716–1800), Intendant of Poitou

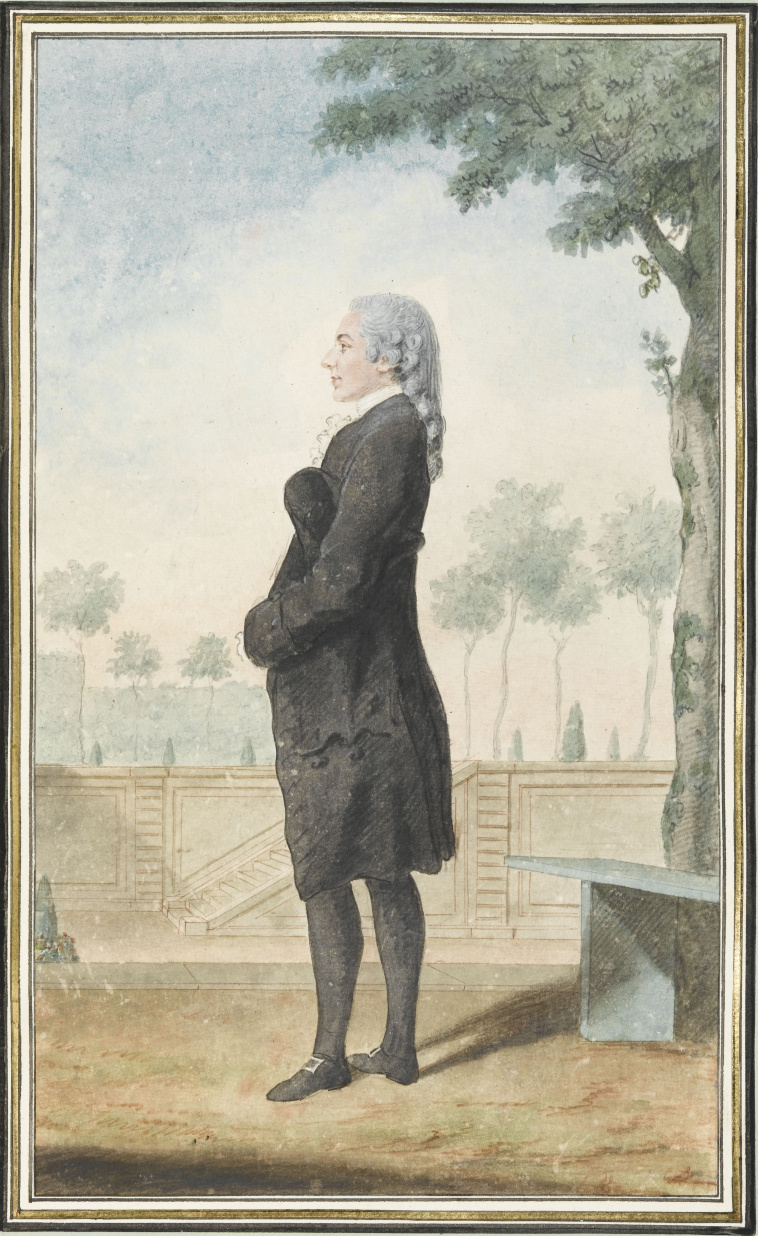
Charles Esprit de La Bourdonnaye (1753–1840), Peer of France

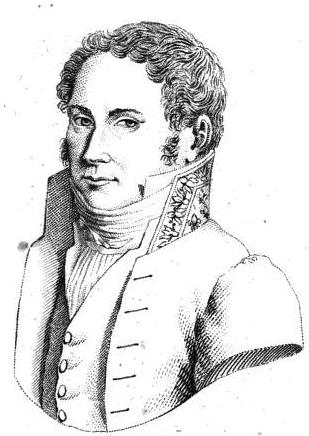
François-Régis de La Bourdonnaye (1767–1839), Minister of the Interior

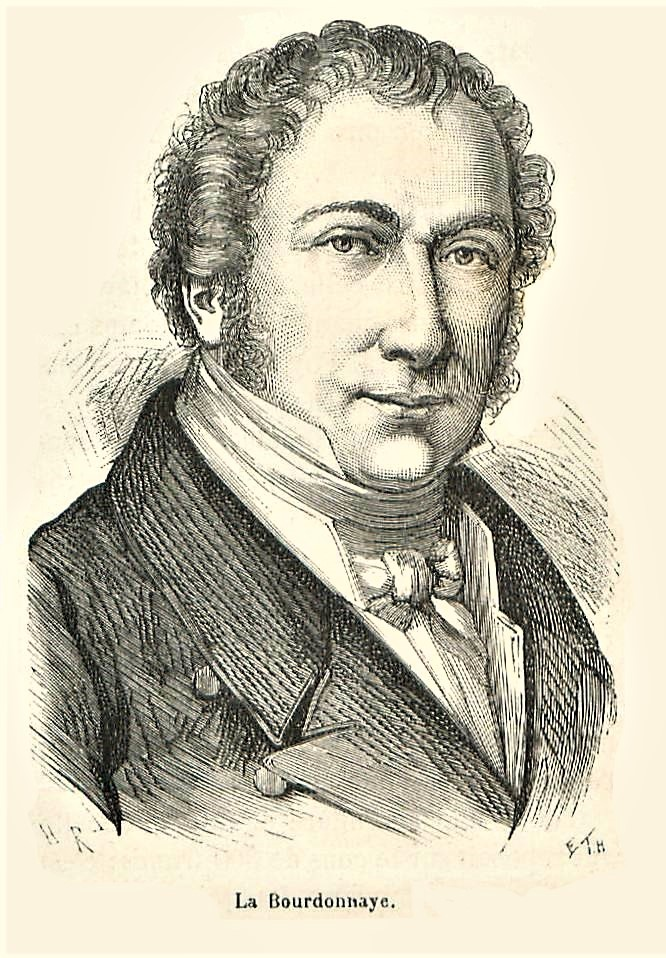
François-Régis de La Bourdonnaye

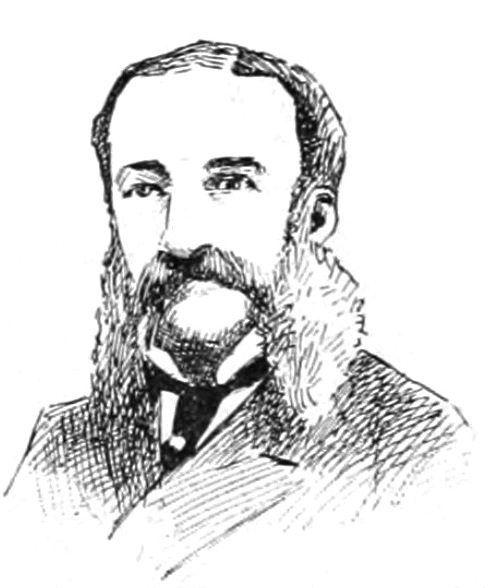
Marie Ferdinand Raoul de La Bourdonnaye (1837–1911)

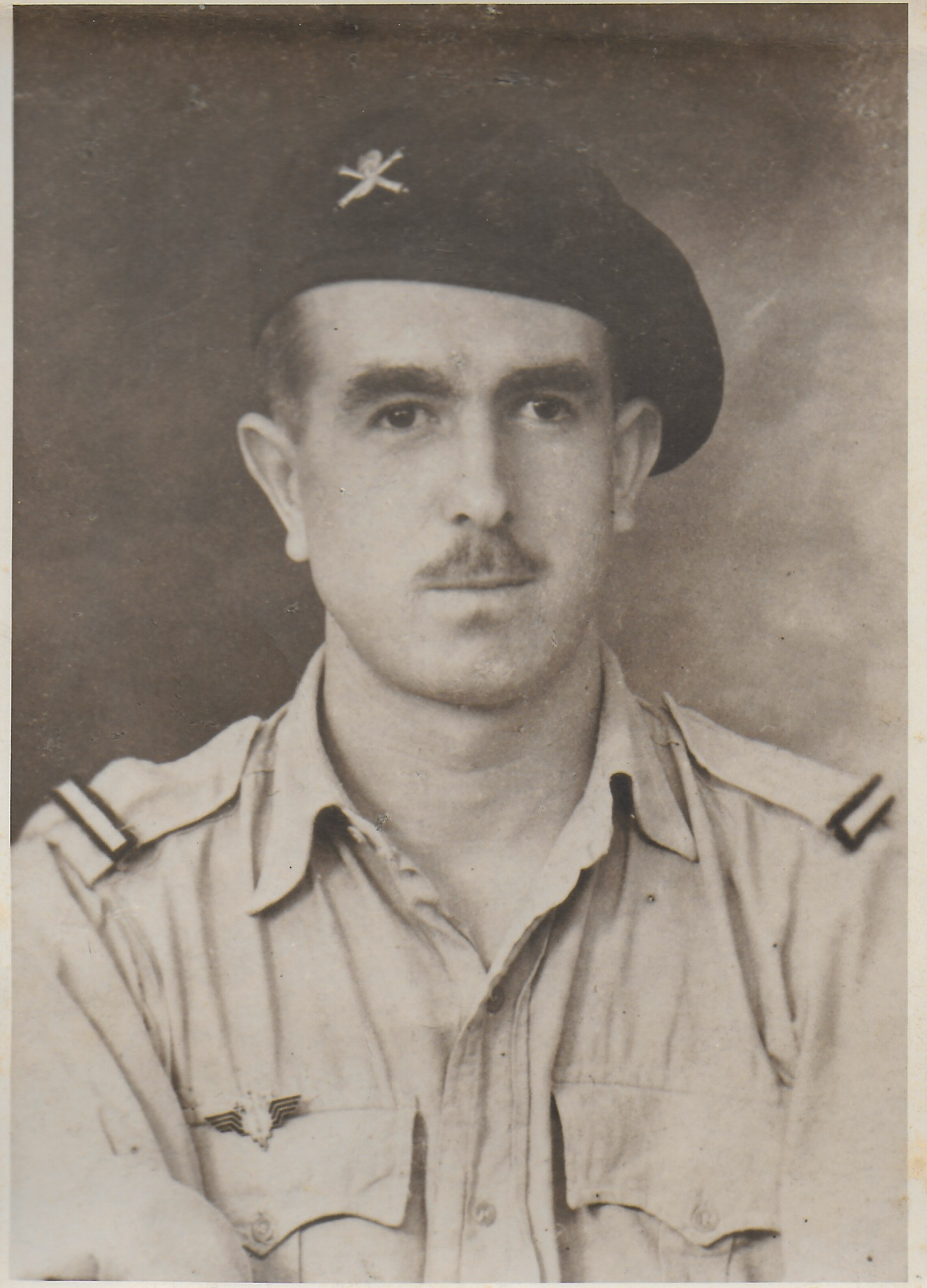
Geoffroy de La Bourdonnaye

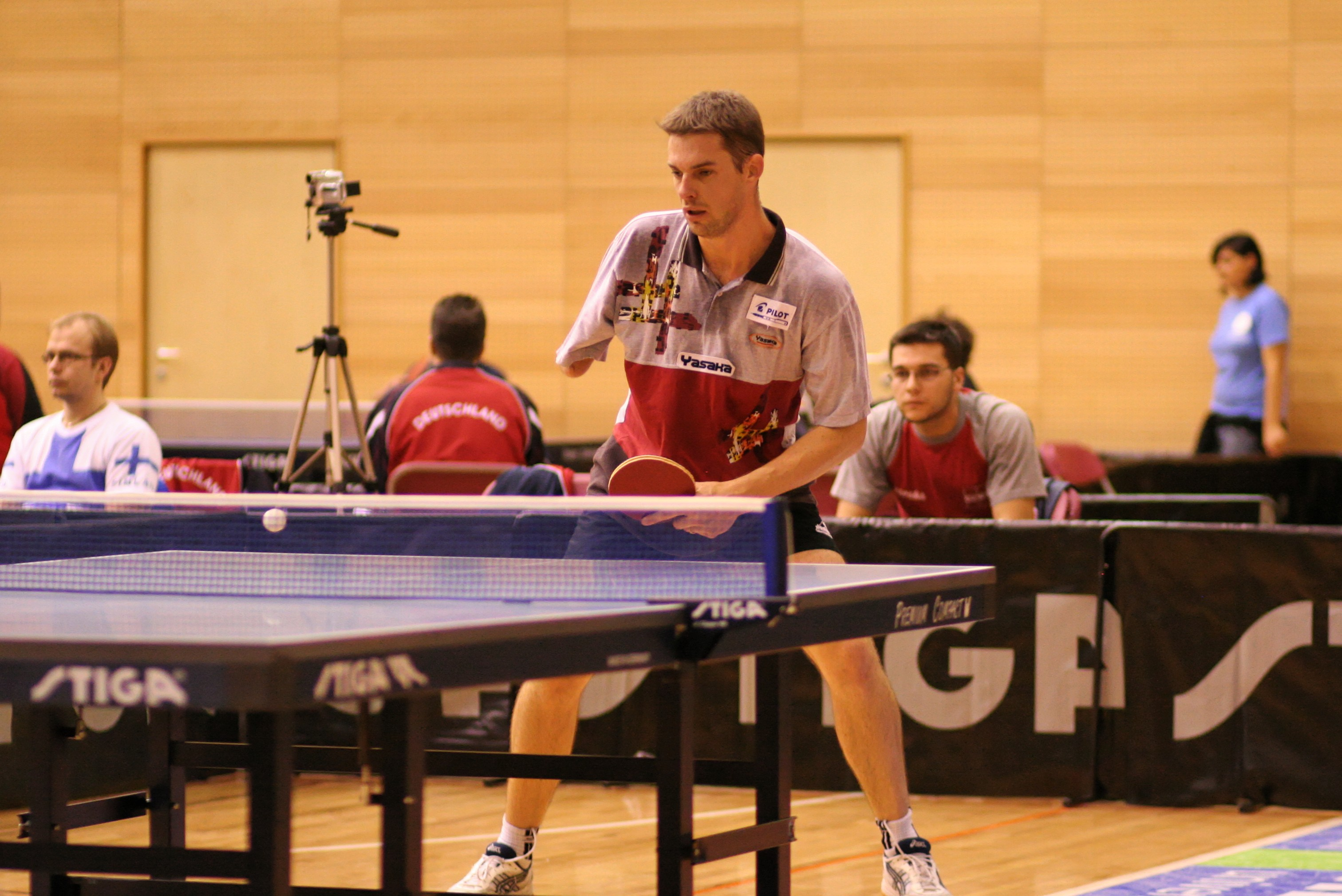
Gilles de La Bourdonnaye

== Arms and titles ==
The various branches of the La Bourdonnaye family received several aristocratic titles throughout the 18th and 19th centuries:

- Viscount of Couétion in 1650 (status of title uncertain);
- Marquis of La Bourdonnaye in February 1717;
- Count of Blossac (status of title uncertain);
- Baron of the Empire in 1809 and 1810;
- Hereditary Peer of France on 17 August 1815 and 27 January 1820;
- Count-Peer on 31 August 1817 and 13 March 1819.
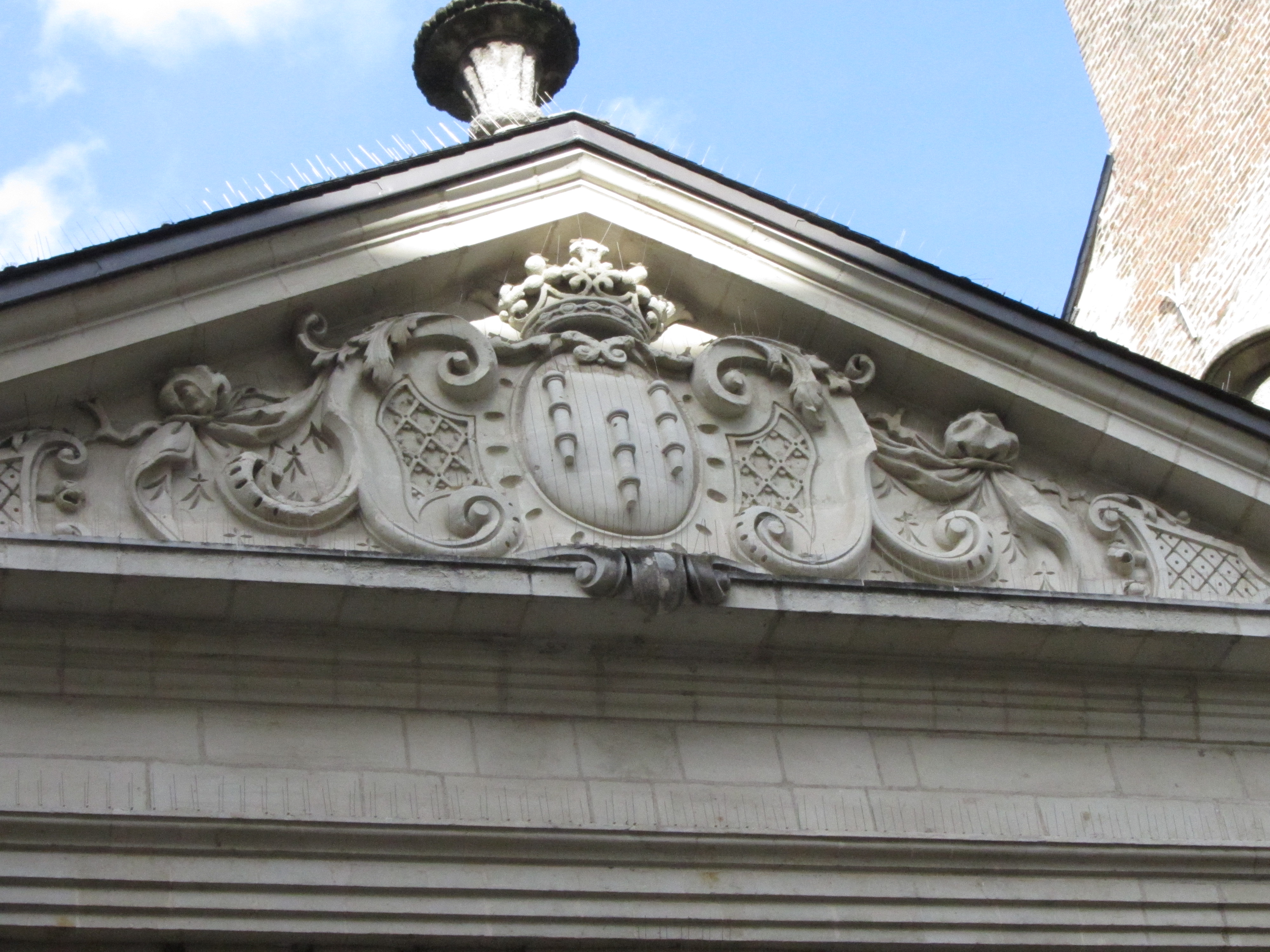
Arms of the La Bourdonnaye family on the portal of the Hôtel de Blossac in Rennes

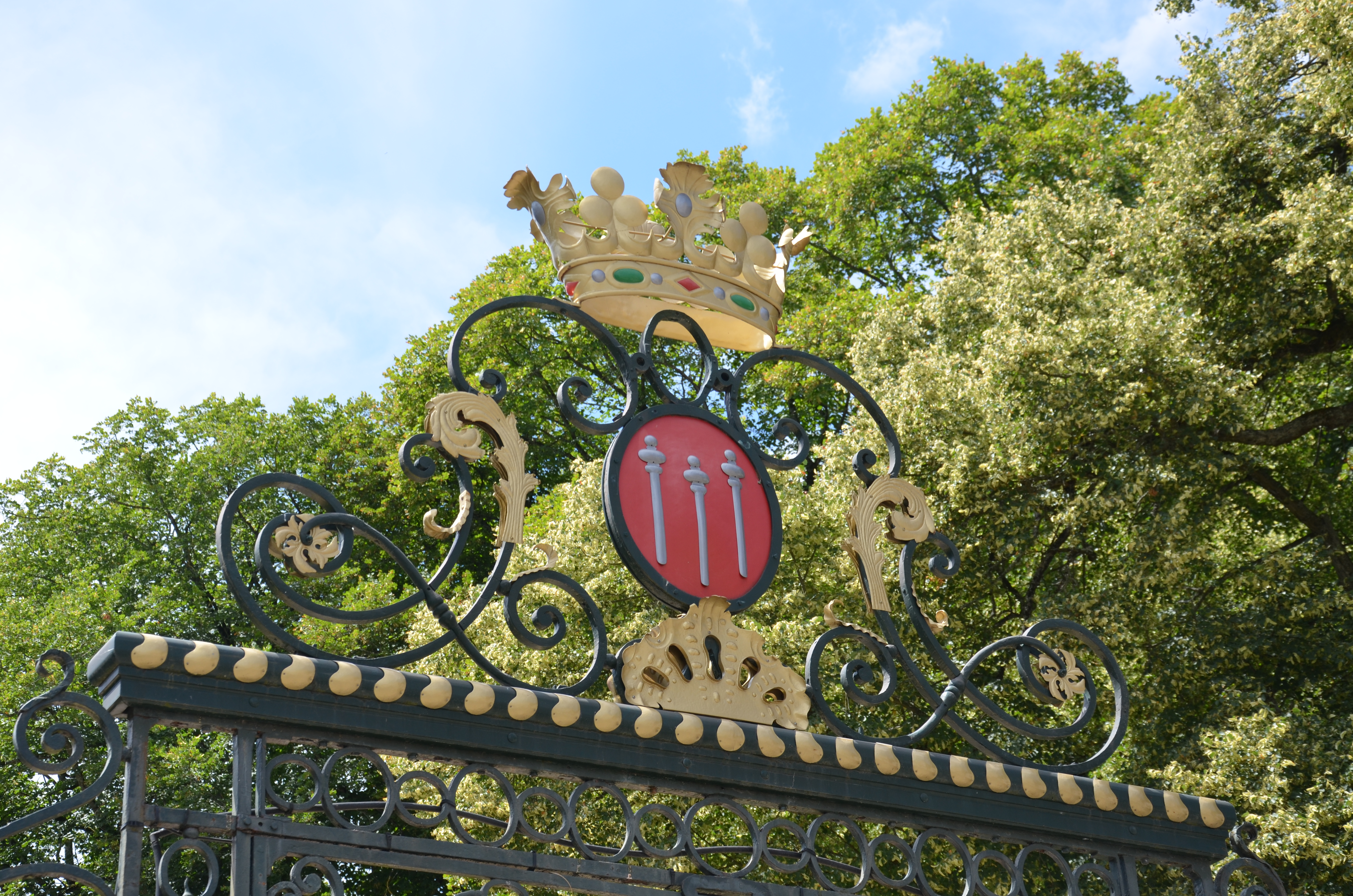
Detail of the main gate of the Parc de Blossac in Poitiers

== Marriages ==
The primary family alliances include the following families: de Vau-Marquer (1350), de La Chapelle, de Boisguéhenneuc (1419), de Gladonnet de Bratz (1482), de Kerguisec (1562), de La Bouëxière (1614), du Breil (1643), de Sesmaisons (1686), Boleylesve de Chamballan (1695), Tranchant du Tret (1765), Bertier de Sauvigny (1782), Vollaige de Vaugirault (1797), de Menou (1829), de Jouenne d'Escrigny (1867), de La Cropte de Chantérac (1876), de la Boëssière-Thiennes (1907), Bernard de Montessus (1930), de Ghellinck d'Elseghem (1934), de Lambilly (1934, 1944), de Kerautem (1939), de Poulpiquet du Halgouët, de Lassus Saint-Geniès (1942), du Trémolet de Lacheisserie, de Garidel-Thoron, de Goulaine, and the House of Harcourt.

== Estates ==
The family has owned several significant properties throughout Brittany and the Loire region, including urban hotels and rural châteaux:

- Château de la Bourdonnaye
- Hôtel de Blossac
- Château de Blossac
- Château de La Varenne
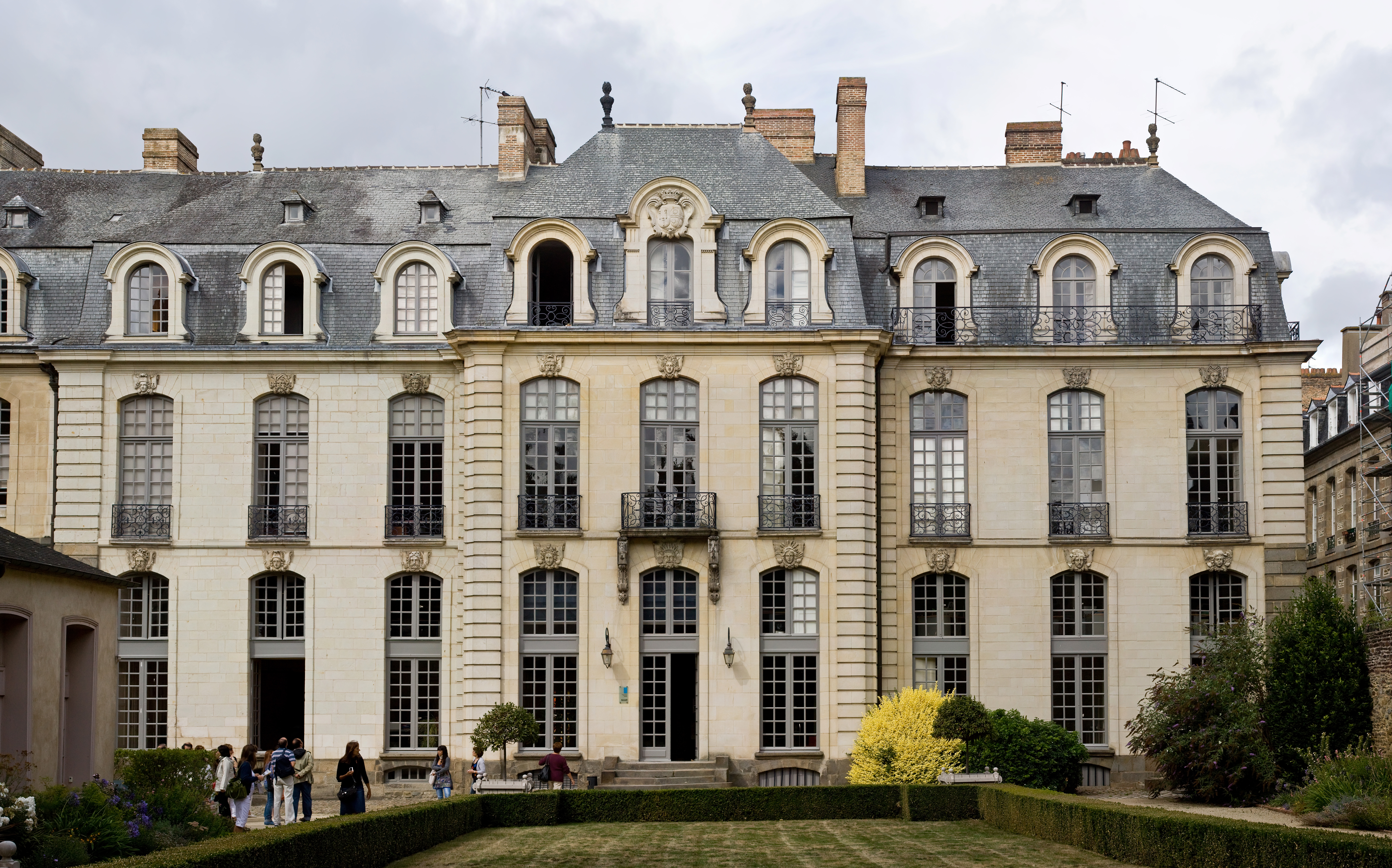
Hôtel de Blossac (Rennes)

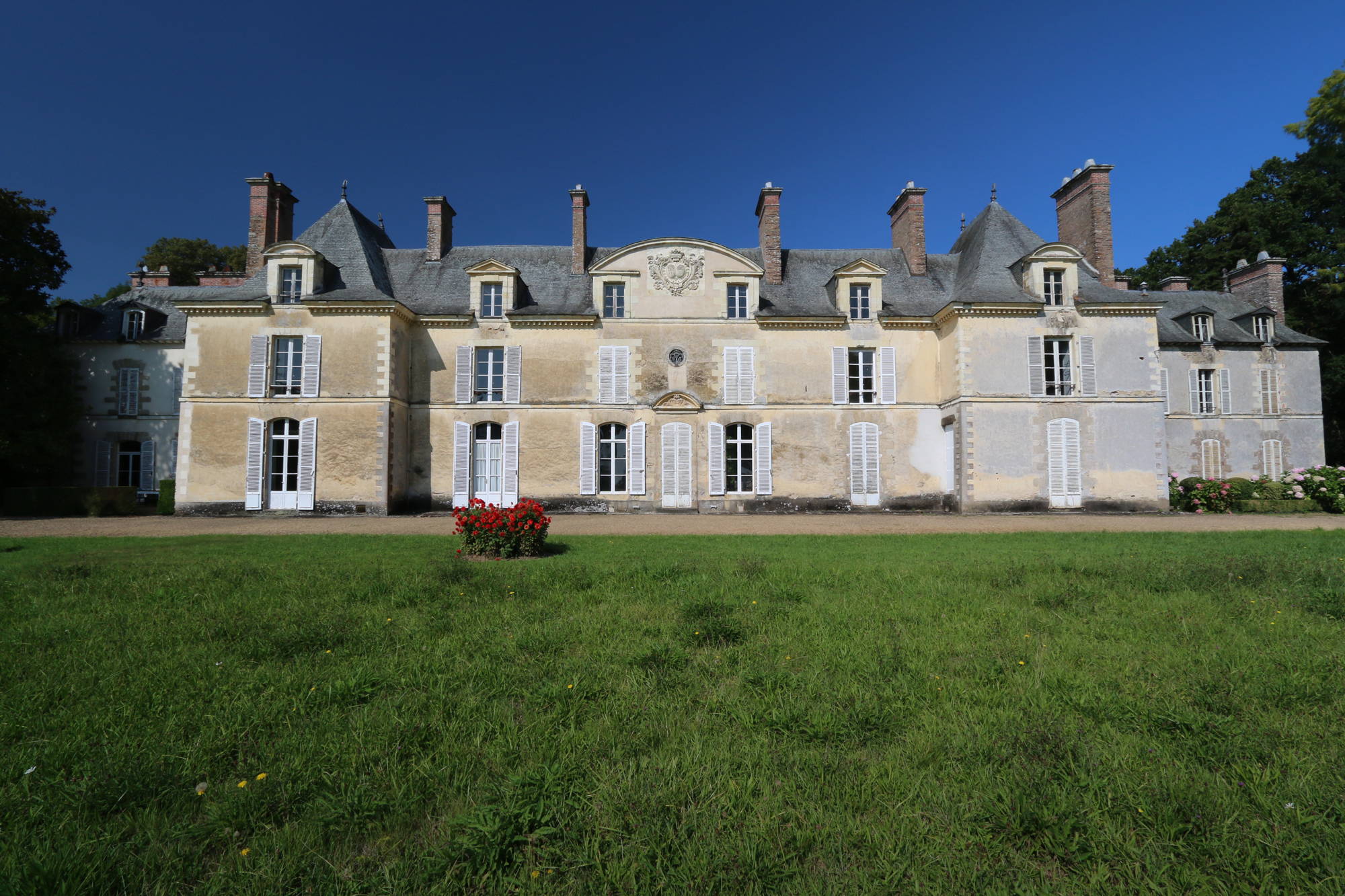
Château de Blossac (near Rennes)

== Legacy ==
The family's influence is still visible in the toponymy of various French cities and municipalities:

- Rue de Blossac in Poitiers
- Rue de la Bourdonnaye in Carentoir, Morbihan

== See also ==
- French nobility
- Ancien Régime
- Parlement of Rennes
- Chouannerie

== Bibliography ==
- Chaix d'Est-Ange, Gustave (1907). Dictionnaire des familles françaises anciennes ou notables à la fin du XIXe siècle (in French). Vol. 6. Évreux: Imprimerie de Charles Hérissey. pp. 161–166.
