= Maison Coilliot =

Coilliot House
- Maison Coilliot
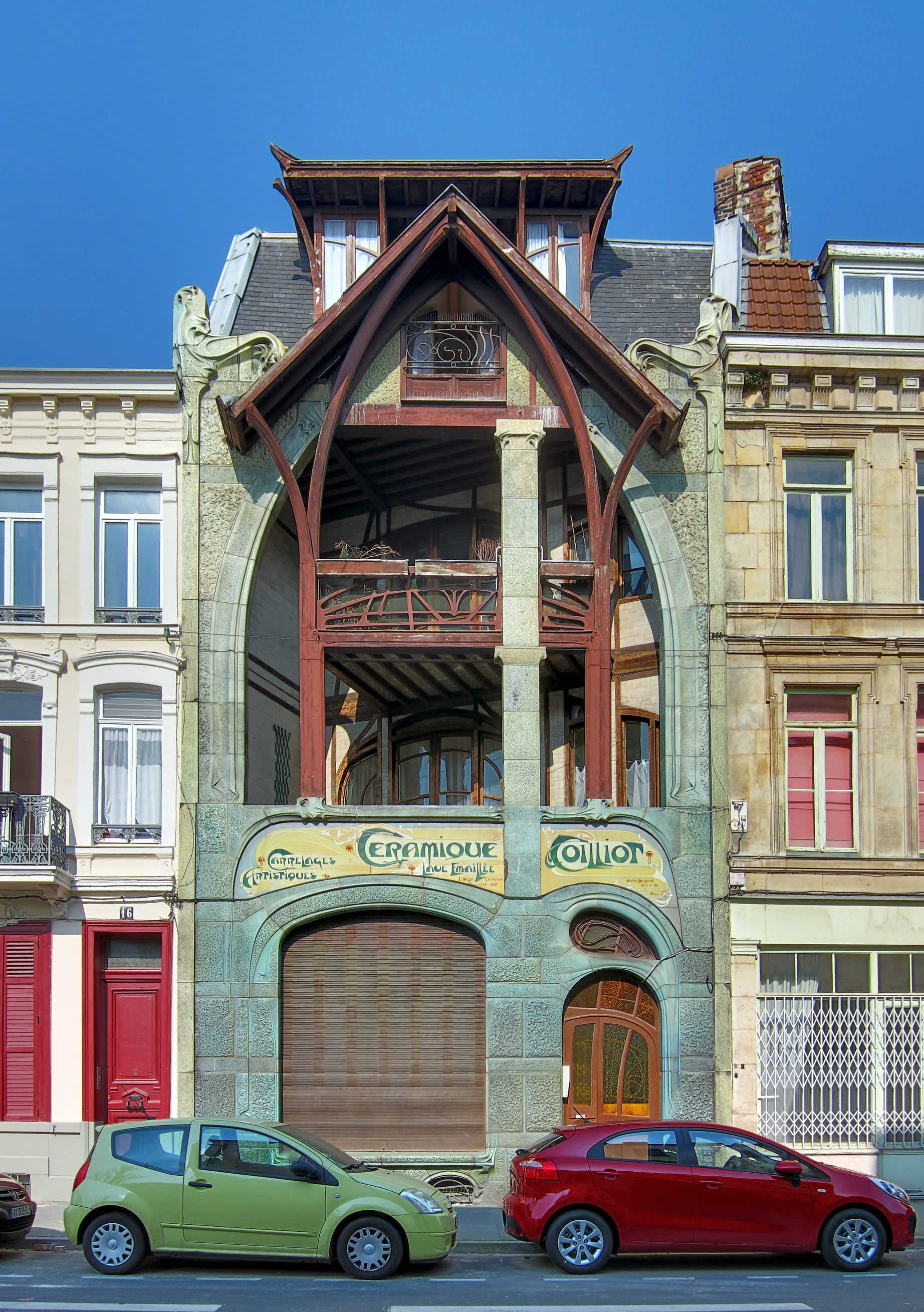
- The house's façade on 14 rue de Fleurus, Lille, France.
- Interactive map of Coilliot House
- Location: Lille, France
- Coordinates: 50.62691°N 3.06020°E
- Designer: Hector Guimard
- Type: House
- Beginning date: 1898
- Completion date: 1900

The Maison Coilliot (Coilliot House) is an Art Nouveau house located in Lille, France, designed by Hector Guimard and completed in 1900. It became a listed building on 16 March 1977.

== History ==
Louis Coilliot, a French ceramic entrepreneur, was fond of enamelled lava and wanted to popularise the technique. To do so, Coilliot commissioned Hector Guimard, an architect he had met at the 1897 fair La Céramique et tous les arts du feu, ("Ceramic Arts & Glass Making"), to apply the technique to his house's façade. Coilliot's factory and warehouse were located to the rear of his house, and therefore the façade held a double purpose, both decorating the front of his home and advertising his business.

== Description ==
The Coilliot House is constructed of bricks and cut stone, with decorative elements in wrought iron, ceramic and enamelled lava. There is a shop on the ground floor, and apartments make up the rest of the three upper floors. The house has two façades: a street façade aligned with the neighbouring buildings’, and a recessed façade which stands at an angle. The two façades are linked by balconies on the two upper floors. Green tiles of enameled lava flank the street façade, whose pediment is surmounted by a wooden roof.

Round the back of the house is a 744 m^{2}-plot on which two buildings that used to be owned by the Coilliot family still stand: the Coilliot company's warehouse, designed by François Hennebique, and a block of flats the family would let for additional income. The whole lot was built on a skewed plot of land; as such, the block of flats has its own address at 13/17 rue Fabricy. While only the Coilliot House itself is a registered building (including its interior), the block of flats and warehouse also feature Art Nouveau details deemed worthy of preservation. For instance, elements of the apartment block's façade at 13/17 rue Fabricy and its ceramic fireplaces were added by the DRAC to the national heritage register in October 2011.

The house is private property and visitors are therefore not allowed in. The house was open to the public only once on 17 September 2000. However, the house's Art Nouveau interior decoration and furniture can be seen in a short clip shot in 1983 and now accessible on the INA website.

== Recent developments ==
In September 2008, the whole lot was to be broken up and sold off piecemeal to different buyers.
