= Louis François de La Bourdonnaye =

French diplomat (1700–1777)

- Born: 1700; Bordeaux, France
- Died: 1777 (aged 76–77)
- Occupation: diplomat

Louis François de La Bourdonnaye de Coëtion (1700–1777) was a French diplomat. He was the Marquis de La Bourdonnaye and the Vicomte de Coëtion, the Intendant de Rouen, a Conseiller d'État.

== Biography ==
He was born in 1700 in Bordeaux, the son of Yves Marie de La Bourdonnaye de Coëtion and Catherine de Ribeyre. He died on 13 July 1777 at the Château de La Bourdonnaye à Carentoir.

He was named Counselor at the Second chambre of Requests of Parliament of Paris 3 July 1722, then Maître des requêtes in 1724. He was named Intendant de Rouen on 31 May 1732.

He organized a festival for the occasion of the convalescence of the king on 10 October 1744.

He was a member of the Académie des sciences, belles-lettres et arts de Rouen and was an active participant in its founding in 1744, and there he was Honorary Professor and Vice President before becoming president in 1745. He published many works in 1746: "De l'Utilité des machines propres à suppléer le travail des hommes" ("The Usefulness of Machines to Supplement Men's Work") and 1752: "Réflexion sur ce qui pourrait contribuer à la perfection des édifices publics" ("Reflection on Who Could Contribute to the Perfection of Public Buildings")

He was named Conseiller d'État Ordinaire on 25 July 1750. He retired from his duties at Rouen on 9 July 1755 due to weakening vision preventing him from reading memoirs and papers submitted to him. He then took on other functions in Paris.

He was presented to King Louis XV on 18 January 1765.
