= Direction régionale des affaires culturelles =

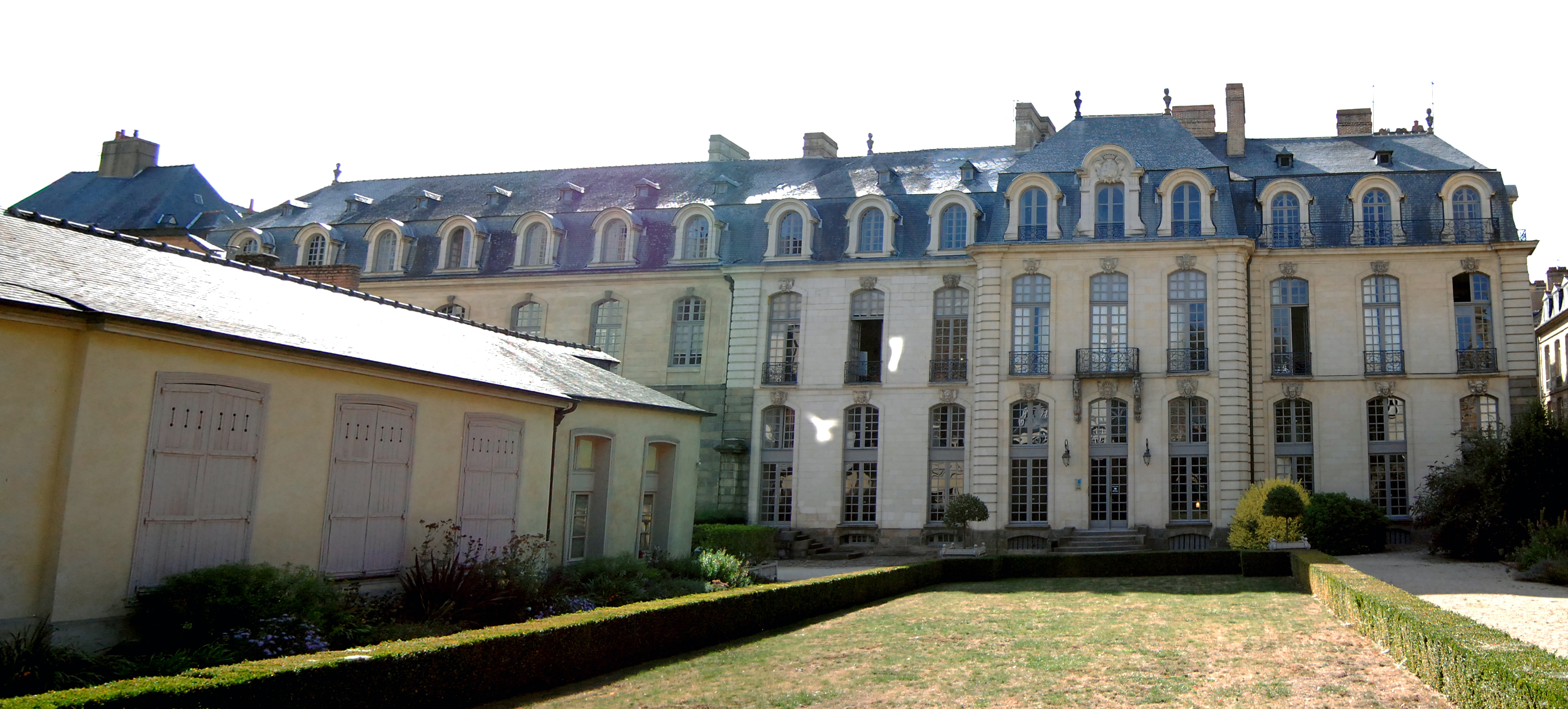
The Hôtel de Blossac is the office of the direction régionale des Affaires culturelles of Brittany.

The Direction régionale des Affaires culturelles (DRAC, Regional Directorate of Cultural Affairs) is a service of the French Minister of Culture in each region of France. Created by Minister of Culture André Malraux on February 23, 1963, it is in-charge of historical buildings (monument historique, managed by the "Conservation régionale des Monuments historiques"), museums, cinema, theatre, and art.

== Origin ==
André Malraux created in each region a Regional Committee for Cultural Affairs (CRAC) by the circular of February 23, 1963. It includes a person in charge of each field of action of the ministry: architecture and archaeology, archives, cinema, artistic creation, artistic education, museums, theater and music, cultural action. Their role was to coordinate national policy at the local level.

In 1968, Malraux asked Claude Charpentier to think about the constitution of regional directorates. His mission led to the creation of five experimental DRACs from 1969, in Île-de-France, Rhône-Alpes, Alsace, Provence-Alpes-Côte d'Azur and Corsica. Jacques Duhamel and Jacques Rigaud ratified their generalization, effective under Françoise Giroud, in 1977.

In 2010, the DRACs merge with the departmental services of architecture and heritage. They are governed by decree no. 2010-633 of June 8, 20103. In the overseas departments and regions, these services are called "Direction des Affaires culturelles".

== Organisation ==
The DRACs are placed under the authority of the regional prefects and, for certain attributions, of the department prefects. They are in charge of implementing, at the regional level, the priorities defined beforehand by the Ministry of Culture and Communication. They also provide expertise and advice to the various local authorities and local cultural partners. Their missions cover all the sectors of activity of the ministry: Literature, music, plastic arts, dance, theater, cinema and audiovisual, scientific and technical culture, museums, archives and heritage. They are therefore the regional representatives of all the Ministry's departments.

Beyond the application of the directives of the central administration in each of these domains, the coherence of a global policy in the regions rests on them. They ensure the communication and the implementation of all the interventions of the ministry according to the objectives common to all the sectors and indicated as priorities by the minister, namely:

- Territorial development and the expansion of audiences;
- Artistic and cultural education;
- Cultural economy.

In order to carry out these actions, each department has a regional headquarters and territorial units. The regional director of cultural affairs is surrounded by a team with a wide range of scientific, technical, artistic and administrative skills. This team includes thematic advisors for the different fields of action of the ministry, such as the advisor for books and reading, or the advisor for museums. Each regional office has an information and documentation center open to the public.

Each department includes, among others, the following services:

Regional Conservation of Historic Monuments (CRMH): in charge of the legal protection of historic monuments;

Departmental units of architecture and heritage (UDAP) (architects of the buildings of France): services in charge in each department of the scientific and technical control on the ground of the Historic buildings, the surroundings of the historic buildings, the sites and the promotion of the architecture and the heritage;

Service régional de l'archéologie (SRA) : in charge of the control of archaeological sites and preventive excavations;

Pôle Création-Diffusion: contributing to the encouragement of artistic creation (theater, music, dance, plastic arts) and the economy of cultural industries (cinema-audiovisual, books and reading) and gathering the advisors responsible for these sectors.

The Regional Inventory Service, in charge of the general inventory of cultural heritage, has been placed under the responsibility of the region since January 1, 2007, in application of law no. 2004-809 of August 13, 2004.

The headquarters of the various DRACs are located for the most part in the same cities that host the regional prefecture, with the notable exception of Normandy (Rouen is the prefecture but the headquarters of the Normandy DRAC is in Caen) and the Occitanie region (Toulouse is the prefecture, but the headquarters of the Occitanie DRAC is split in two, one part in Toulouse and the other in Montpellier).
