= Hôtel de Blossac =

French townhouse

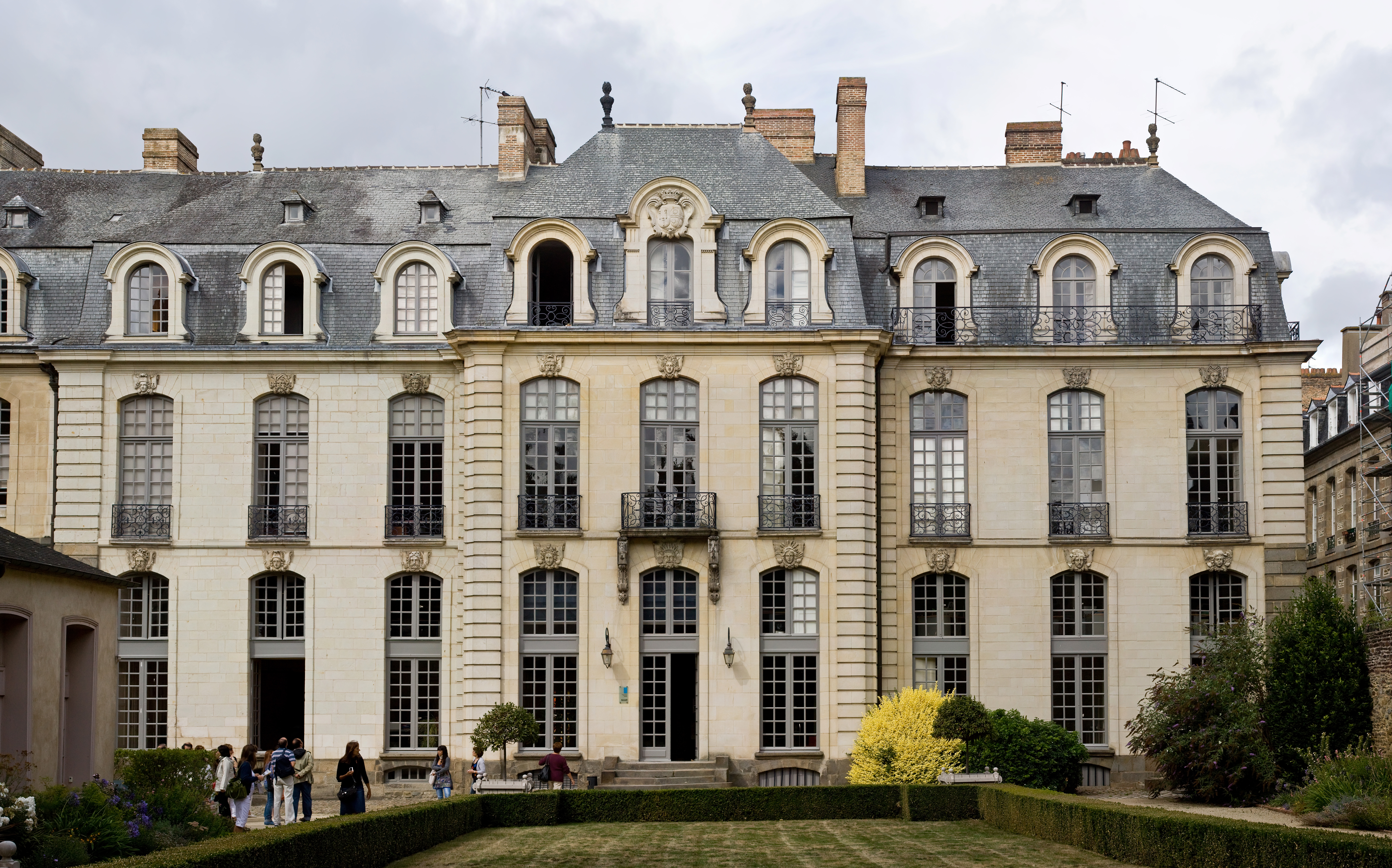
- Facade of the hotel, side garden
- Interactive map of Hôtel de Blossac
- Location: 6 Rue du Chapitre, 35000 Rennes, France, hisctoric center
- Coordinates: 48°06′41″N 1°40′56″W
- Designer: probably Jacques V Gabriel
- Type: private hôtel particulier, apartments, now office of the direction régionale des Affaires culturelles.
- Beginning date: 1728
- Monument historique since 1947.

The Hôtel de Blossac is an 18th-century hôtel particulier in the historic center of Rennes, Brittany.

The building, which has two main wings, was constructed in 1728. (A fire in 1720 had destroyed much of the city of Rennes.) The architect is said to have been Jacques Gabriel. The building has a unique classical architecture for Brittany, including its size, the assembly of several architectural components, and its grand staircase.

Property of the La Bourdonnaye family, earls of Blossac, for nearly two centuries, it was leased by the city as the residence of the commander in chief of the province of Brittany, with a pomp reminiscent of the court of France. At the French Revolution, it was divided into apartments and became a residential building, where the author Paul Féval was born.

The building was designated as a historic monument in 1947, and underwent a complete exterior restoration spread over three decades, while the apartments give way to offices. It has been wholly owned by the state since 1982 and houses, in refurbished and restored rooms, the Direction régionale des affaires culturelles (DRAC, Regional Directorate of Cultural Affairs of Brittany) and in service quarters, the service territorial de l’architecture et du patrimoine (Territorial Service of architecture and heritage of Ille-et-Vilaine).

== Site ==
=== The hôtel in Rennes ===
The hôtel de Blossac is located in the northwest in the secteur sauvegardé (protected area) of the historic city center. Its address and the main entrance, a porch, are at 6, rue du Chapitre. It is surrounded by rue de Montfort Street (at the east) and on the rue Saint-Sauveur (at the north). Two doors, one condemned and the other for use by staff, are arranged in the garden wall. (Note: This door is the 1, rue Saint-Sauveur.) The western part (hôtel and service yard) is adjacent to other buildings or courses leading to deprivation. The hôtel garden offers views of Blossac the south side of the basilica of the Saint Sauveur, whereas since the floors of the hôtel it is possible to see, at the west, the nearby Rennes Cathedral.

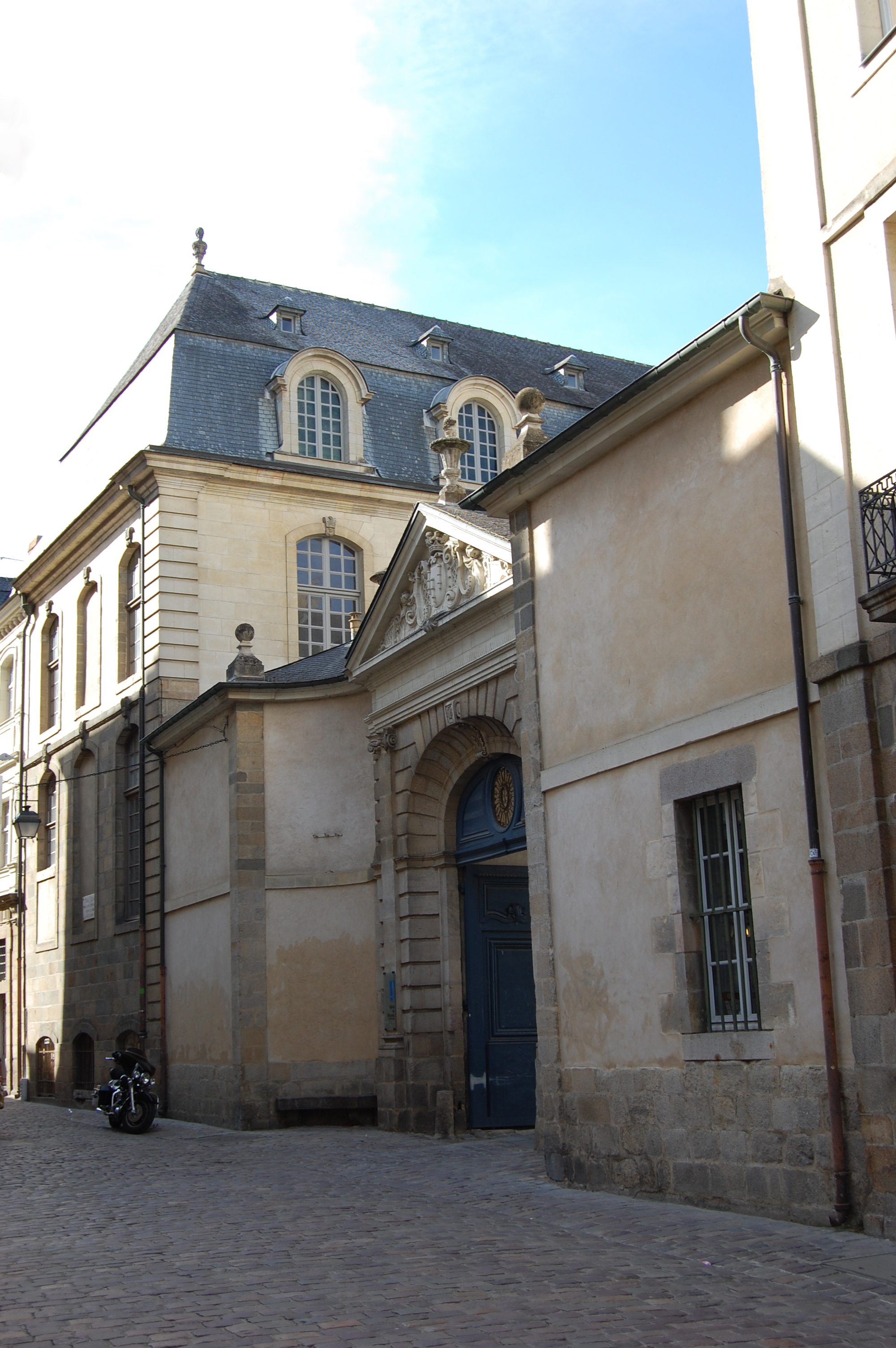
Main entrance on the rue du Chapitre.

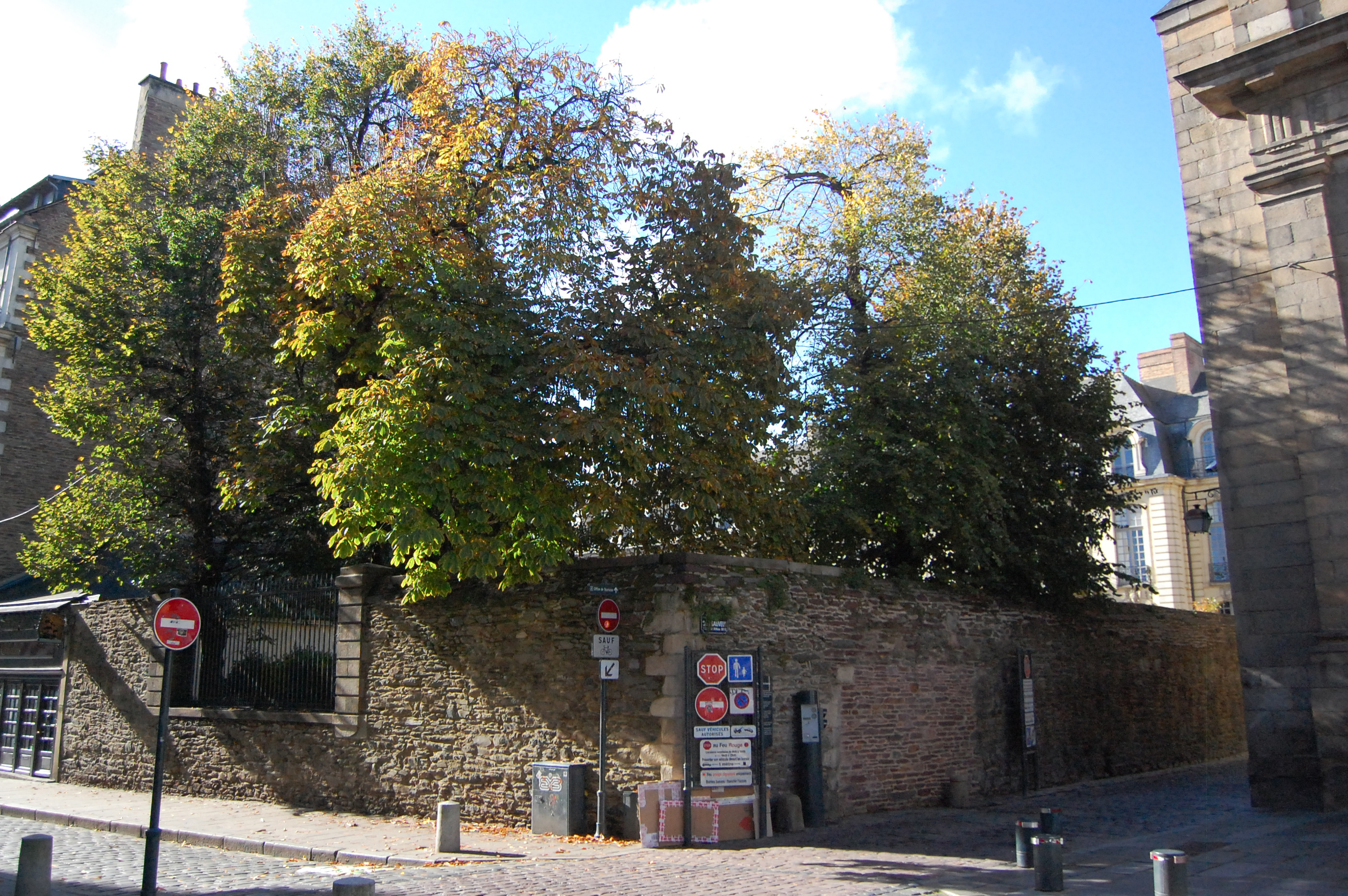
The Garden wall see from the place Saint-Sauveur.

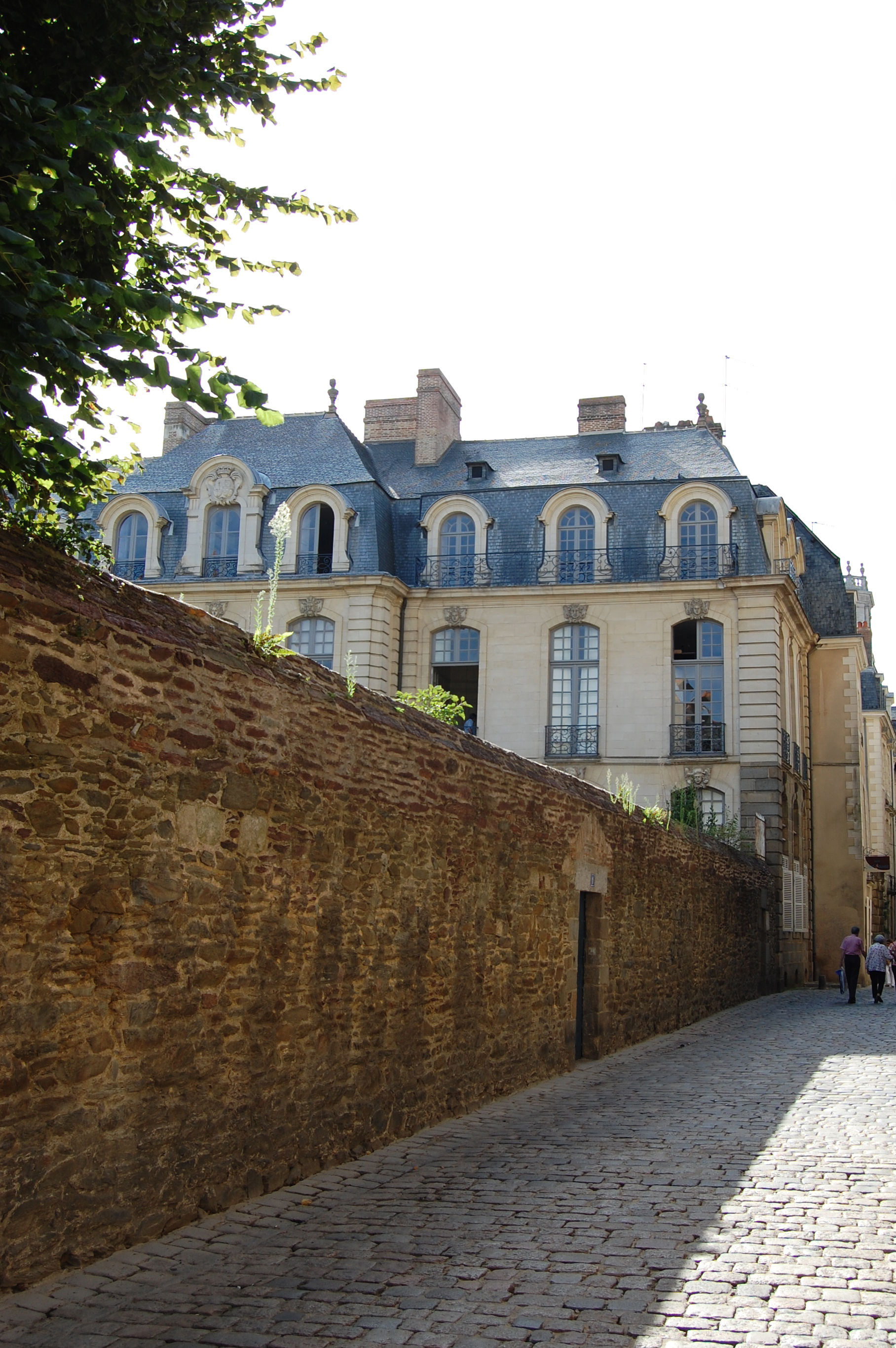
View from the rue Saint-Sauveur. We can see the private door in the wall.

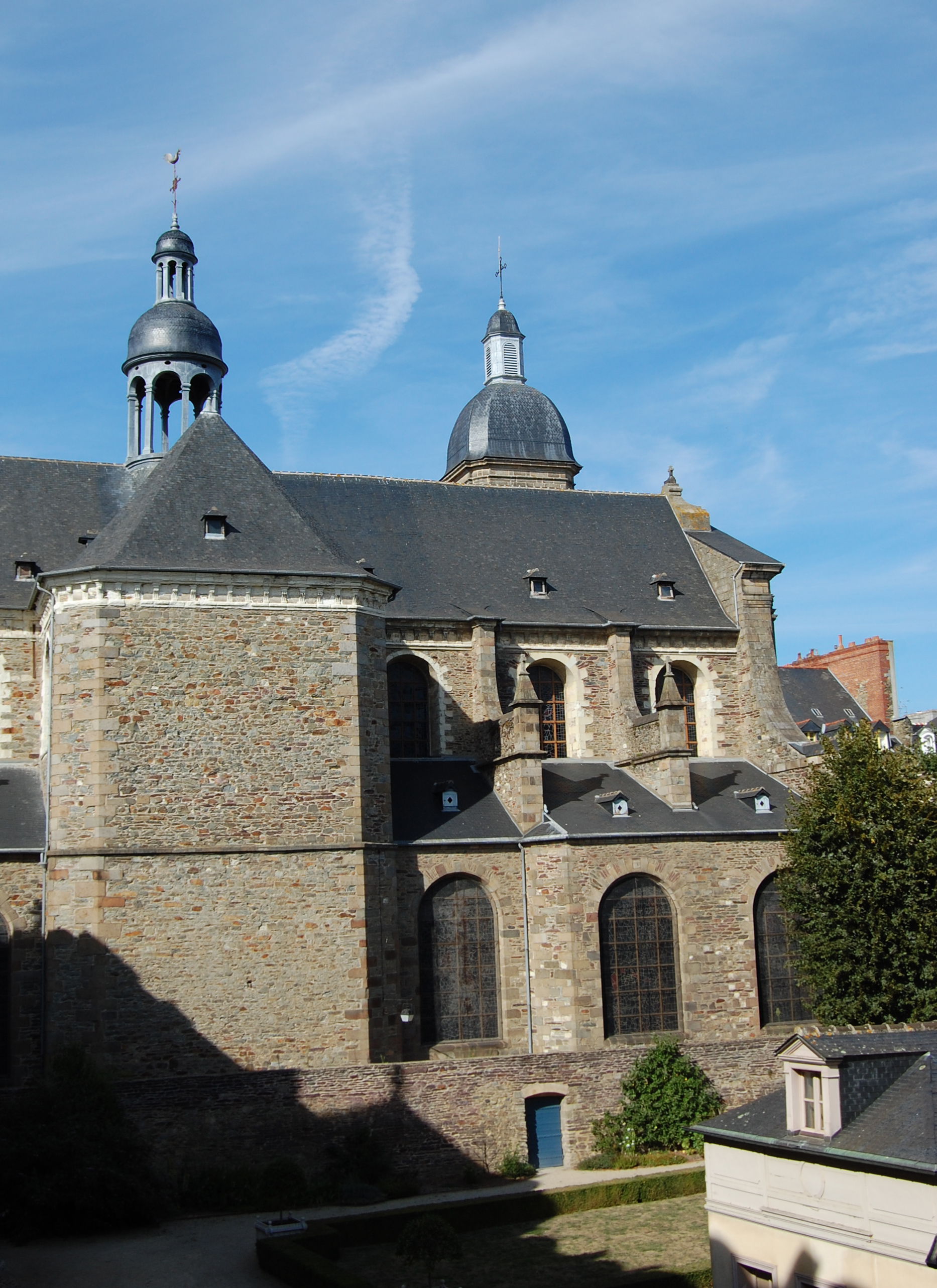
Vue basilica of the Saint Sauveur, at the north of the hôtel.

=== The hôtel in itself ===
Map of the hôtel in 2010. The hôtel de Blossac The hôtel de Brie The entrance porch Stables Gallery The garden Others buildings

The hôtel de Blossac consists of a main body, from the streets of rue du Chapitre to rue Saint-Sauveur. This building is divided into two parts: the side yard on the north and the garden side yard on the south. The side garden has a perron and an elaborate façade, while the courtyard side is more austere, but contains, in the south, the grand staircase. Facing the courtyard are the old stables, with perpendicular, the gallery overlooking the garden. On the back side of the body court is the court service, accessible through the passage of the staircase. It gives a windowless wall to the east, and the hôtel de Brie in the south. This hôtel is older than the hôtel de Blossac (1624), and was reused in the building of the building.

As the hotel is a public building, it is possible, during office hours, visiting the external (courtyard and garden) and the staircase, including access to the documentation library. Those outside are usually open to the European Heritage Days.

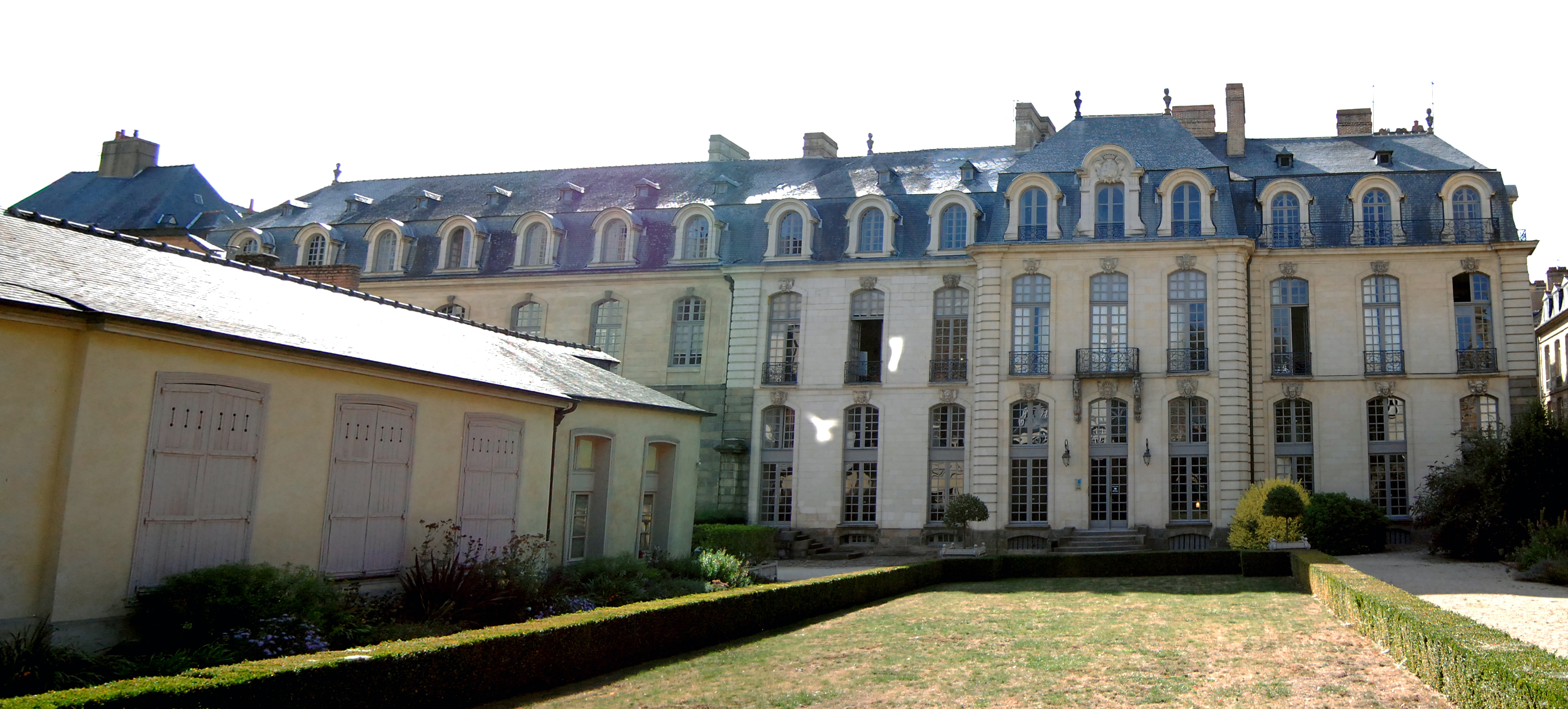
Panoramic view from the garden. Left: in the foreground, the old gallery and the end of the stables in the background, the hôtel courtyard, right: the hôtel garden. At the center : the garden side façade and its entry.

== History ==
=== Before Blossac, the Hôtel de Brie ===
Hôtel de Brie and parts burned map in 1720 House of 1624 Prior house Service quarters Stable Burned parts Other remaining parts

The hôtel de Brie (or hôtel du Bois de la Motte) is, in 1720, a composition from several buildings parts of the prior petit Fontenay manor. The hôtel de Brie is itself built in 1624 on the rue du Chapitre by the family Loysel de Briz. This construction replaces wooden houses, for which it had to pass through to enter the petit Fontenay. This hôtel is allocated in 1692 at the residence of the intendant of the King in Brittany, and this until 1725. The hôtel de Brie goes from Loysel de Brie family to the de Cahideuc family, who sell in exchange the building to Louis Gabriel de la Bourdonnaye of Blossac in 1727.

Its configuration is classical compared to others constructions in Rennes: two buildings separated by a courtyard, one of them overlooking the street. They still exist today. A passage under the house give access to the courtyard, both for cars and pedestrians, passing houses the staircase to the floor. One common gallery and service quarters link the two buildings on the east side of the court. Stables, east of service quarters complement the set.

Apart from the wooden stables, Hôtel de Brie by its stone construction, and thanks to the will of his owner not to build in wood, stop the burning of Rennes in 1720, protecting the western part of the city. Hôtel de Brie probably communicated with the adjoining house, so called the Psalette, and also on the Rue Saint-Sauveur through the petit Fontenay.

Nowadays, it remains no trace of these passages, except for a construction in the service yard of the Psalette. Hôtel de Brie is the only white stone facade of the 16th century in Rennes.

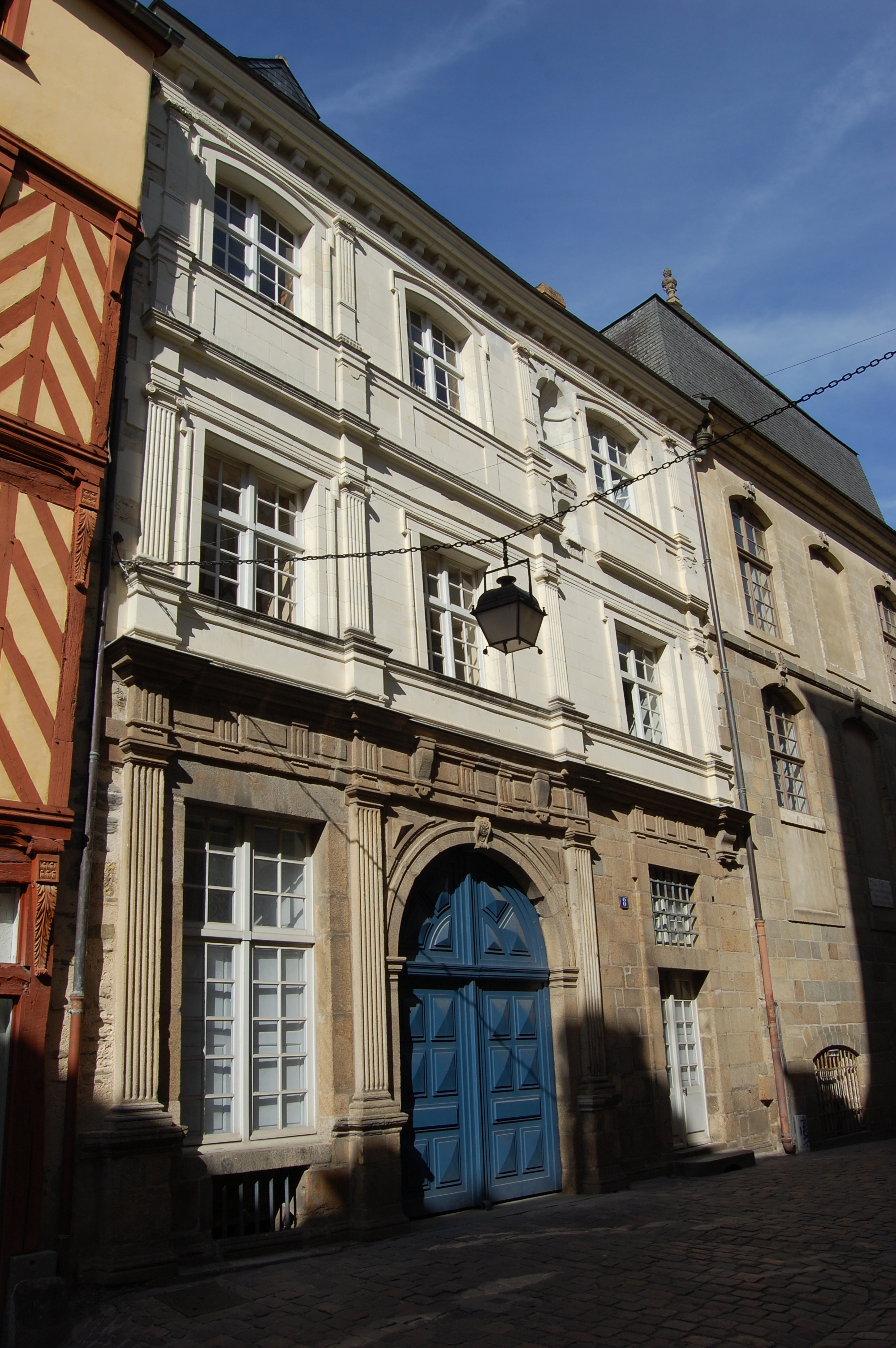
Hôtel de Brie view from the rue du Chapitre. The blue gate passing under the hôtel was reopened in 1990.

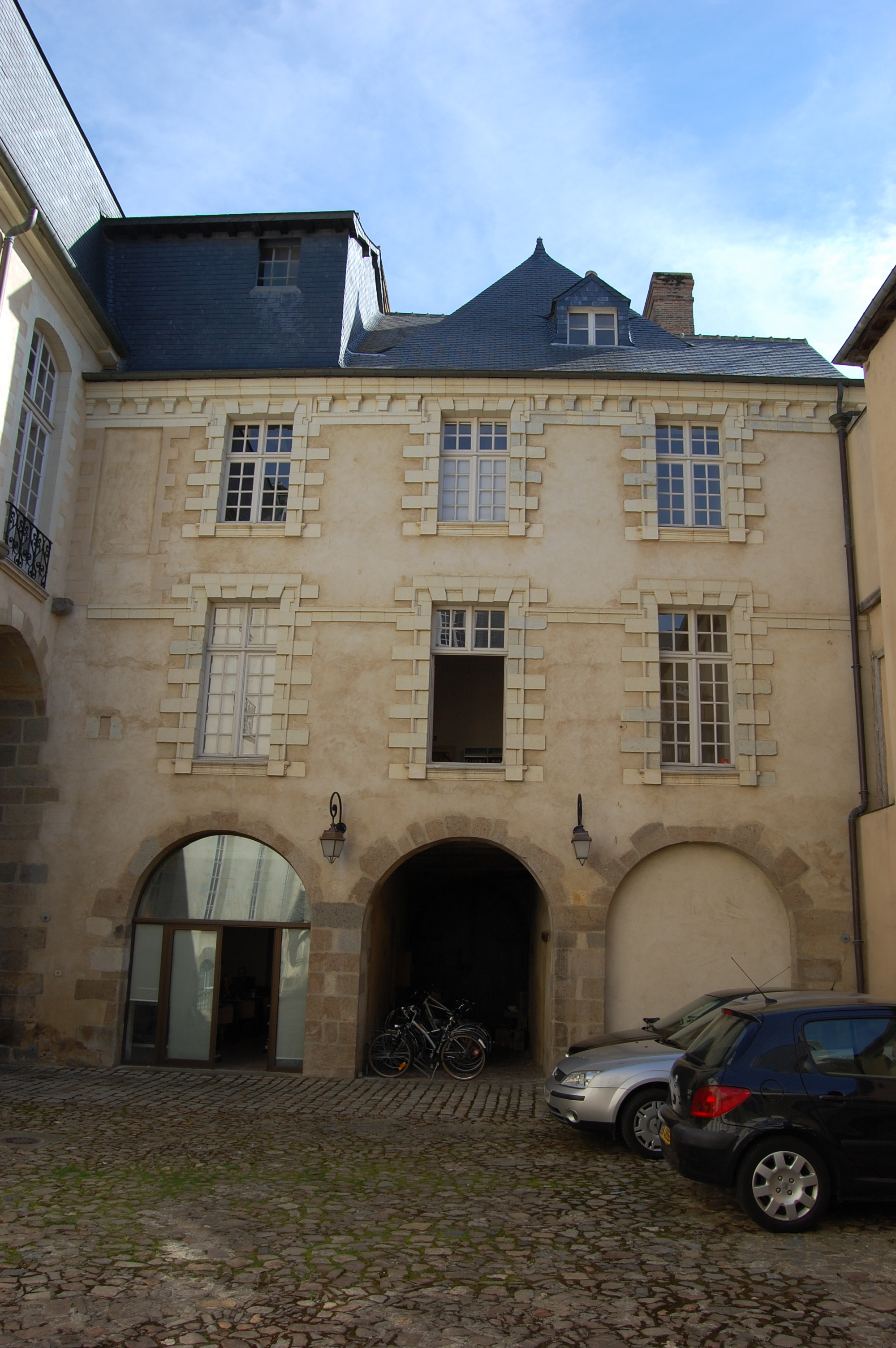
Hôtel de Brie from the service yard. The passage under the building became the bike shed and storage bins.

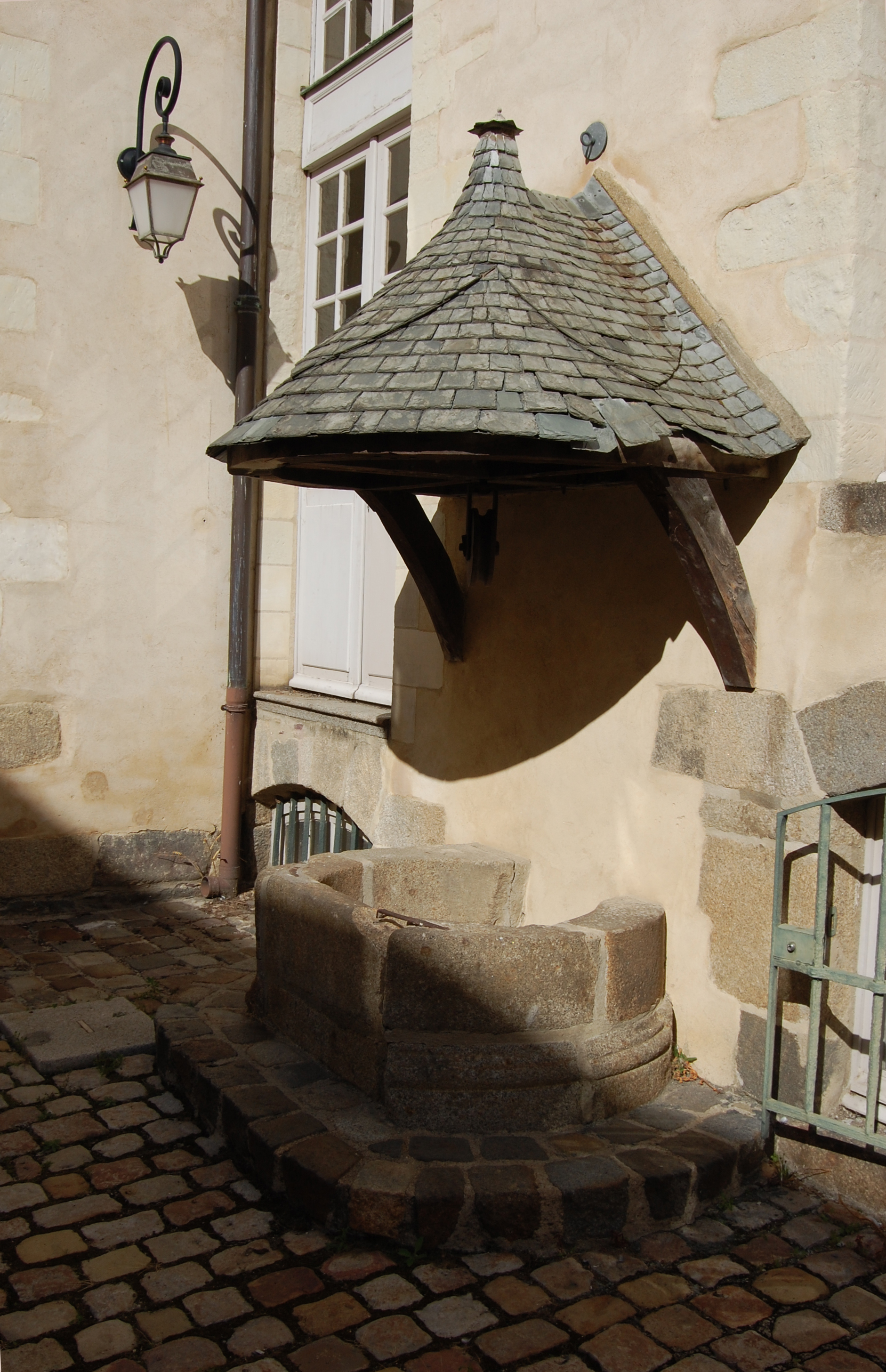
The wells in the service yard, built into the hôtel de Blossac.

=== Construction of the hôtel de Blossac ===
==== The need and the location ====
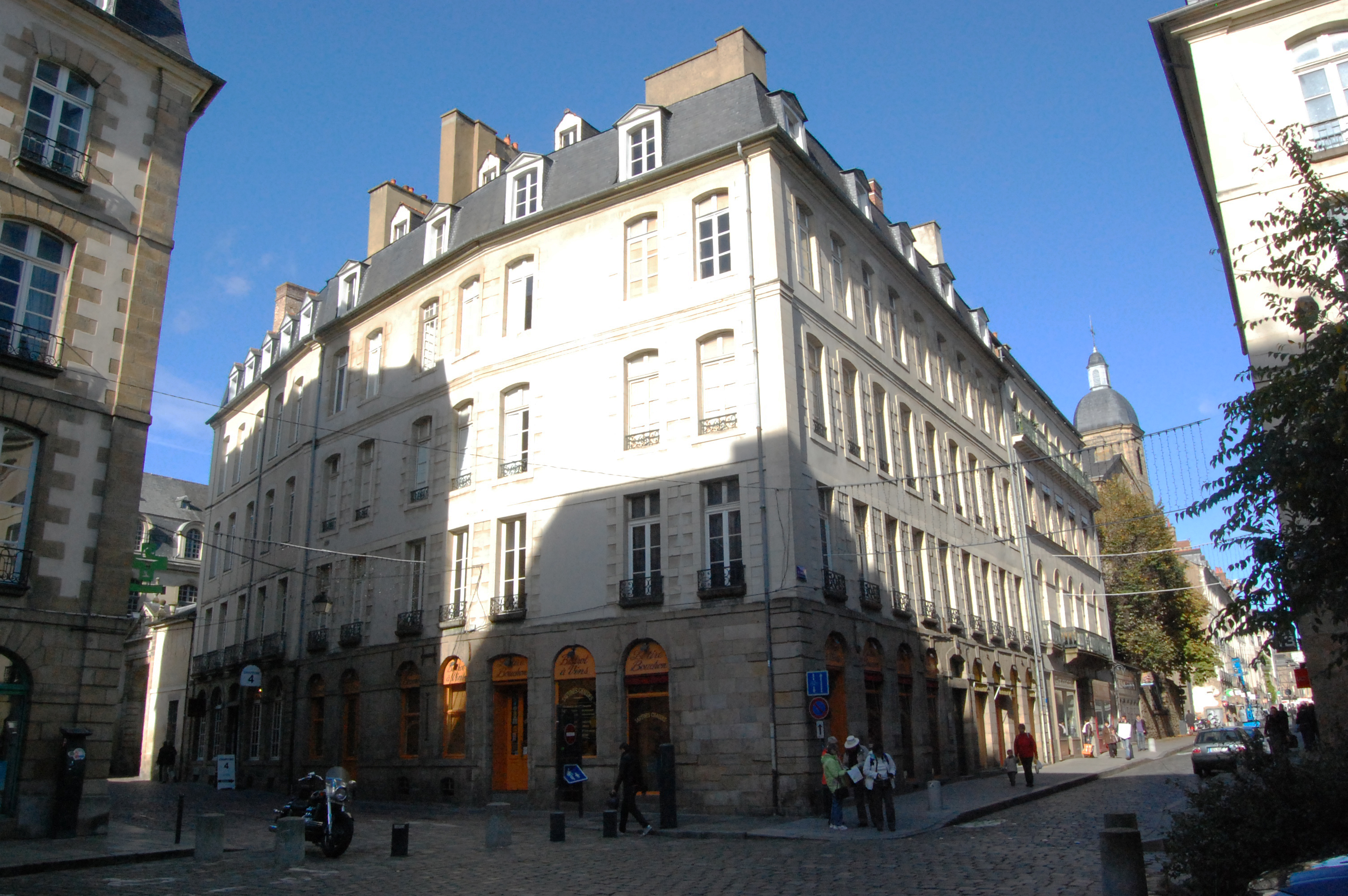
Buildings on the south-east parcel, in the style adopted for the reconstruction of the city. We can see the gate of the hotel on the rue du Chapitre (left), and trees of the garden in the rue de Montfort (right).

Available area for construction after the Rennes fire. 1624 buildings Prior buildings Service quarters Area purchased by the family La Bourdonnaye Other buildings

The hotel in 1728. Hôtel de Blossac Hôtel de Brie Other buildings

The hôtel de Blossac was built in 1728 on the initiative of Louis Gabriel Labourdonnaye, Earl of Blossac, President of the Parliament of Brittany, to make it his residence. Jean-François Huguet supervise the construction.

The construction is done on a bare area resulting from the Rennes fire in 1720, partly by taking the old Hotel de Brie in the west and enjoying the place left by the fire in the east. The new parcel is bounded by the street south of the Chapitre and the Saint-Sauveur (and church) to the north, remain, while the limit on the street is becoming the rue de la Mitterie, traced in a straight line and called Montfort Street. The southeast corner is the only occupied by other buildings rebuilt in 1723 on style adopted for the new city. The plan prepared in 1722 by engineer Isaac Robelin in charge of rebuilding the city, leaving the family to a surface Labourdonnaye strangely arranged, which will start construction of the “Hôtel de La Bourdonnaye de Blossac” in 1728.

==== The hôtel de Blossac ====
The hôtel de Blossac will therefore occupy the entire width of the plot which is vested in maximizing the potential of this surface: the main body separated into two distinct parts (courtyard garden to the south and north side), rooms distributed in length.

The distribution on the first floor is identical to the ground floor. This separation may have been conceived from the start of construction to put a home worthy of his office available to the intendant of the province, housed in the Hôtel de Brie. Like the stately homes, this is a distribution in a row: after a passage through the staircase, visitors are received in a hallway. It communicates with a very large room by the guard room. This very large room, paved, is designed for receptions and meals until the construction of the garden gallery. Follows the side of the old court, a wooden staircase leading to all levels and in the reference room. Side garden, salon company occupies the leading body monitoring the side of the rue Saint-Sauveur, by a study.

In the basement are the offices: in order to provide four meals served by day, a vaulted kitchen is located in the return part, supplemented by more specialized kitchens (soups, desserts, grill, and pastry) sharing the surface in most of the hotel. Kitchens are equipped with fixed positions as well as major iron stoves. Two boilers washing dishes, dishwashers ancestors, are installed in the backyard, and two drying cabinets are present in the service. The ensemble is completed by two parts in service quarters: one room to make coffee and ice-house. Access to the basement was by an internal staircase and a staircase in the grand staircase to the left of the entrance on the ground floor.

In addition, access to ground floor of the building was possible by a staircase near the well at the northeast corner of the service yard, and two staircases at the end of each wing on the garden side. Access to the Hôtel de Brie was via a staircase in this southeastern corner of the service yard, next to the hangars. The mansard roof are reserved for staff, except for the “golden salon” on the third floor of the wing to the north, and use of the balcony, built in 1750.

The garden, planted “à la française”, includes a central piece of turf with four statues around the corner, a round hollow in the bottom bay and fruit trees along the wall of the rue Saint-Sauveur.

It is not known when the work was completed from the hotel itself, although an inventory site was established in 1731. However, some details of the service quarters are dated.

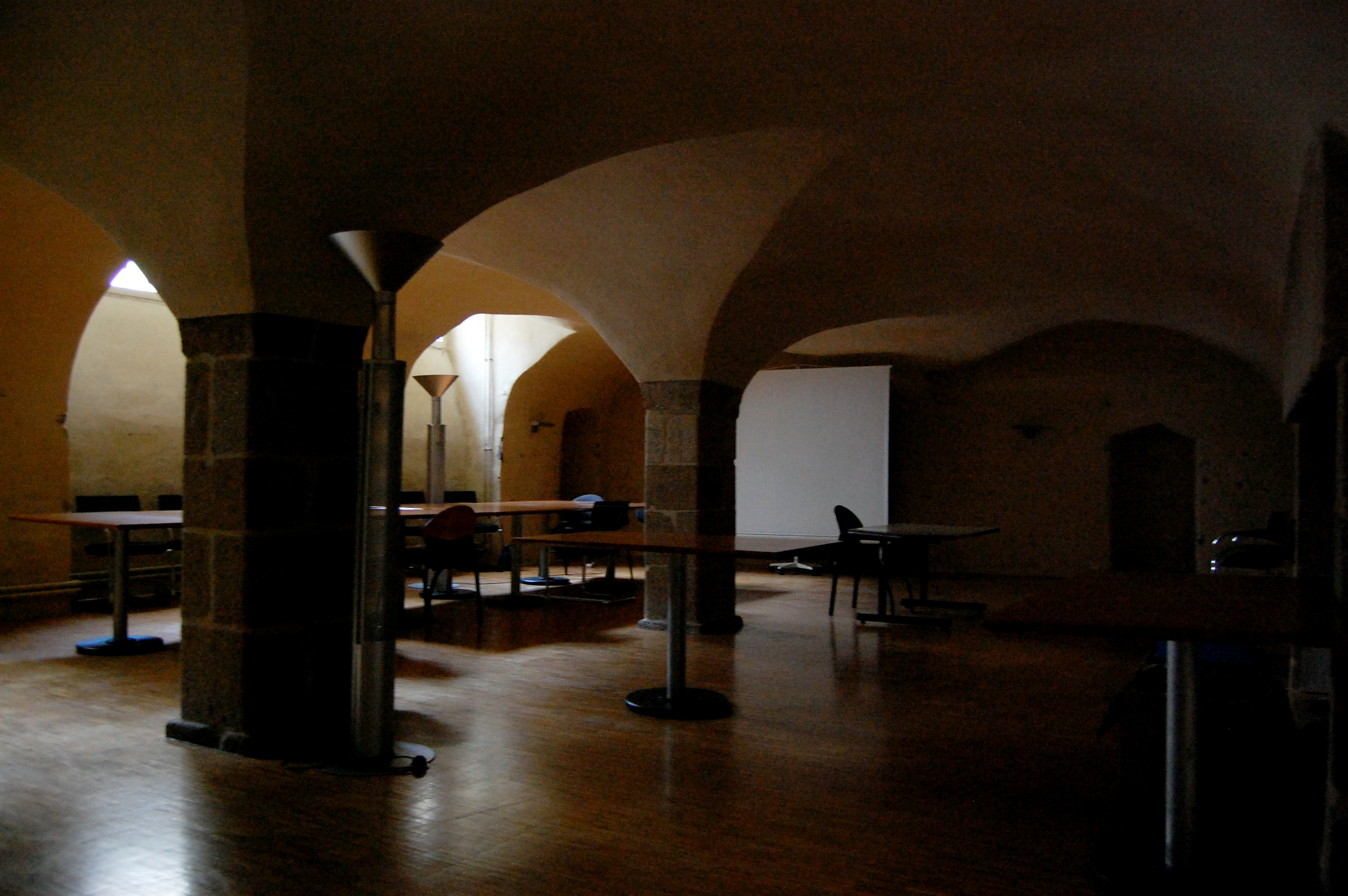
Vaulted kitchen.

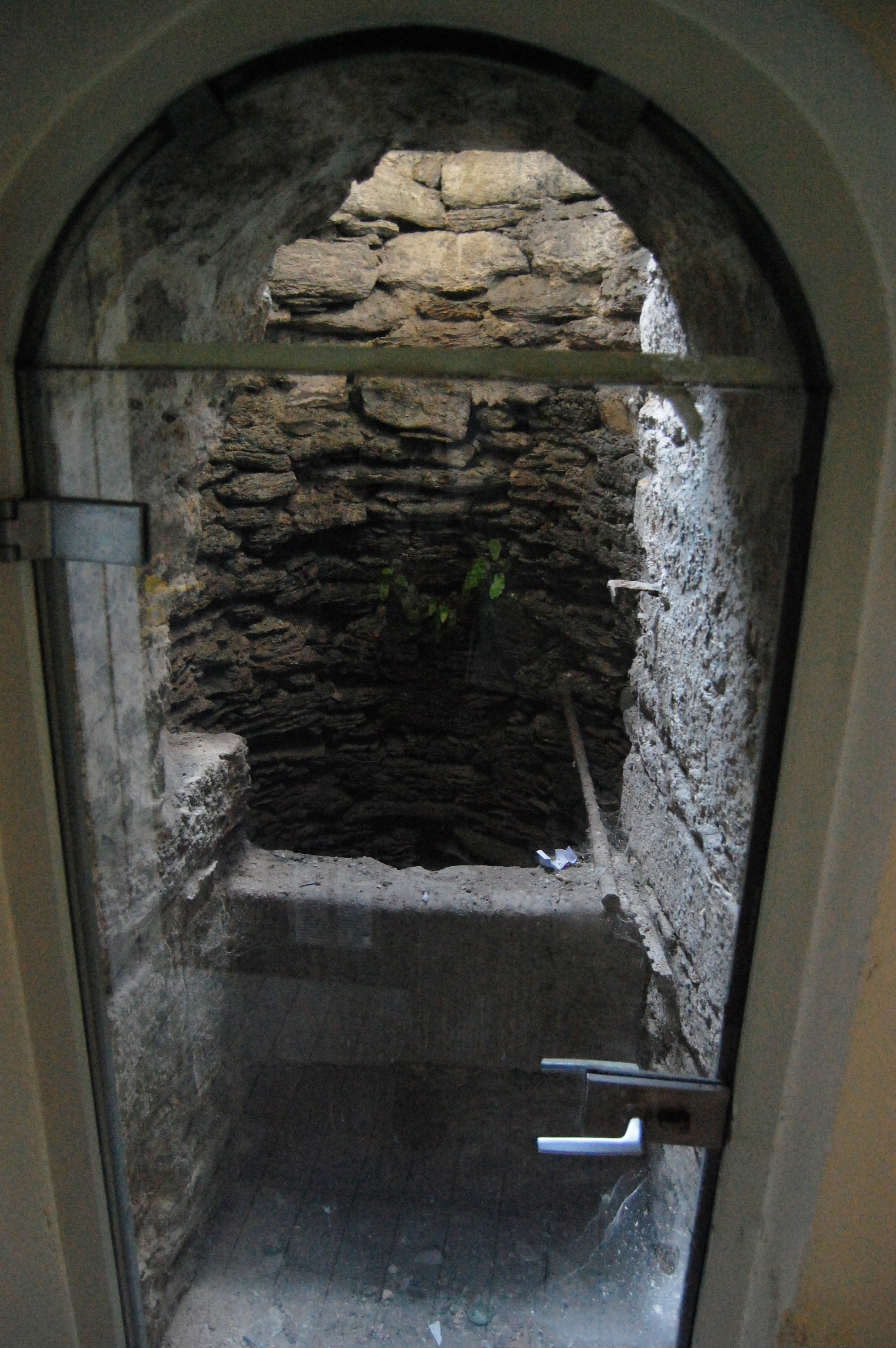
The opening of the well side kitchens.

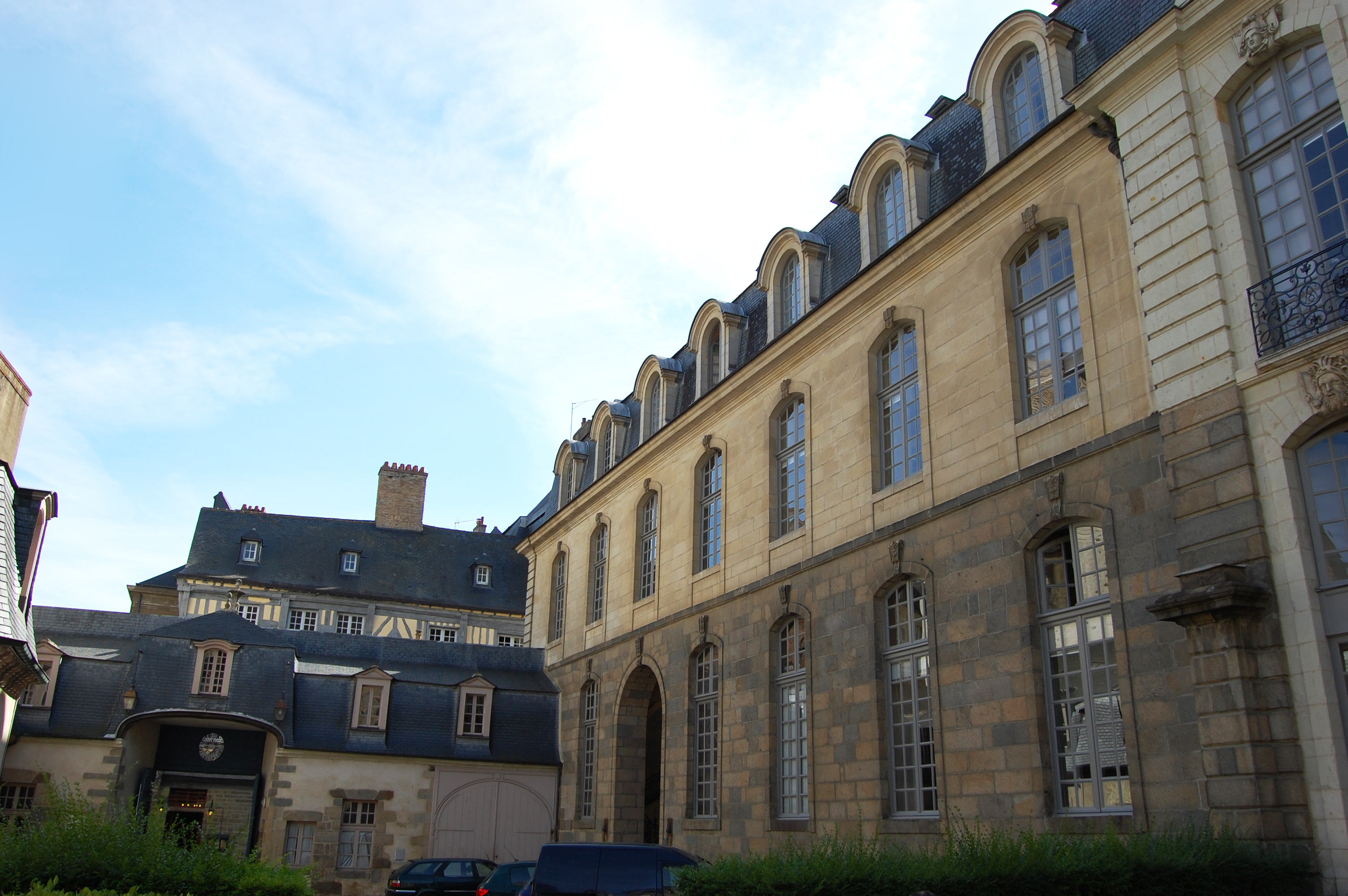
The wing facing the courtyard, view from the garden.

==== The progressive construction of service quarters ====
L'hôtel de Blossac en 1760, doté de tous ses communs Hôtel de Blossac Hôtel de Brie Entrance porch Service quarters Stables Rotisserie Gallery Ice-house Hangars Garden Other buildings

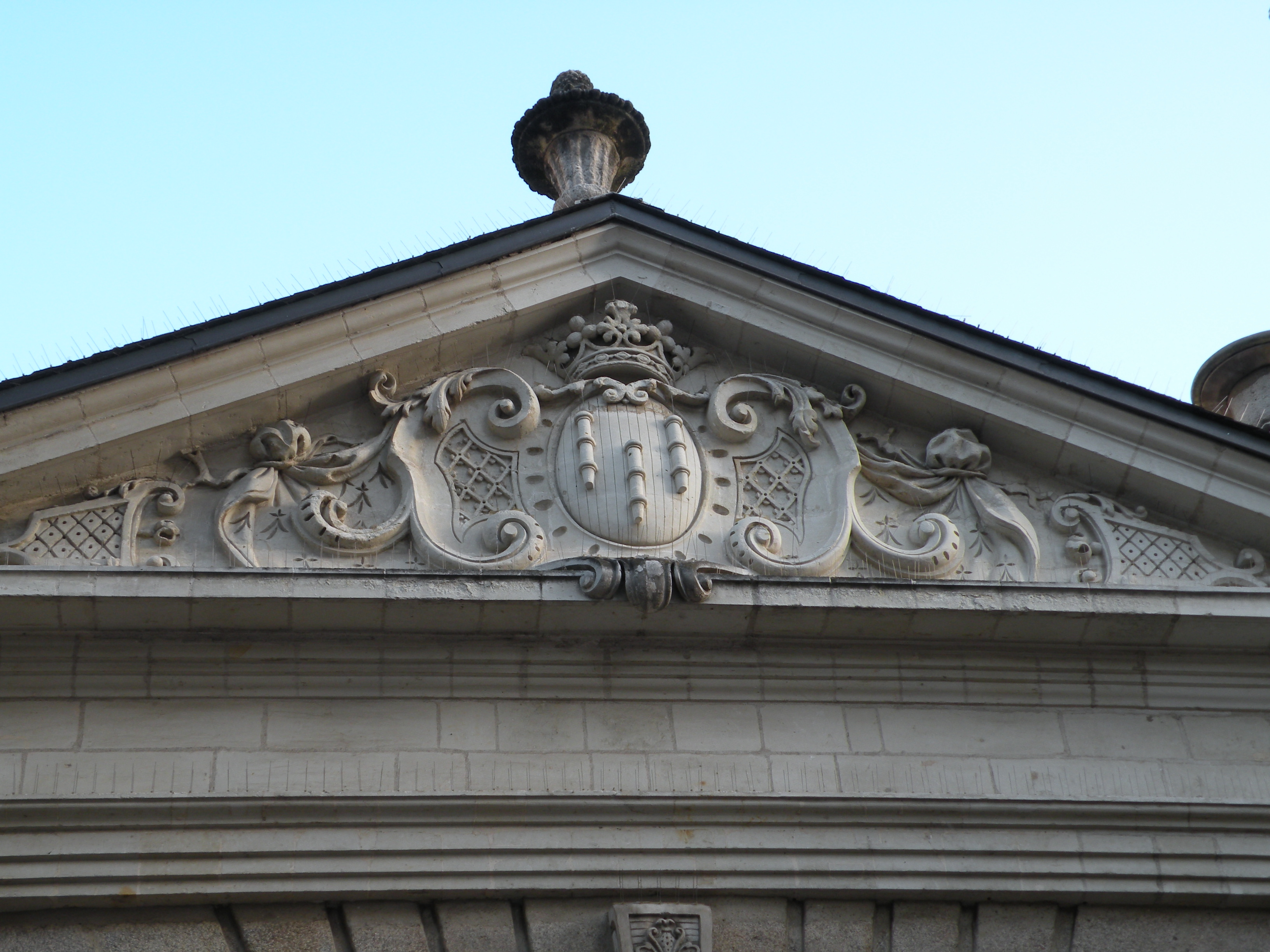
The pediment of the gate, emblazoned as follows: Gules three sticks argent.

A new portal is created in rue du Chapitre in 1730. It is home to the keeper's dwelling, and has a pediment bearing the arms of family La Bourdonnaye, and a monogram of their initials. The pediment was wearing gold letters engraved in marble, the words “Hôtel de Blossac”.

Stables overlooking rue de Montfort are built the same year, to the great displeasure of neighbors whose plots are cropped. They are half-timbered, established pursuant to the lease between the city and family La Bourdonnaye, to be dismantled at will, but vaulted brick inside. Provided for twenty horses, they are insufficient and will be completed almost immediately through the leasing of other stables, rue du Pré-Raoult, outside the city walls. Access to the courtyard of the stables on the rue de Montfort is through a carriage door.

Work continues, with hangars mounted in the service yard in 1732, a steakhouse near the stables in 1739 and in 1745, new joint opposite the hotel, overlooking the courtyard, still half-timbered. These service quarters are home to the first butler, lingerie and the dining room of the guards. The concierge also joined the new service quarters, it seems following the creation in his former post of a room for making coffee, lemonade and horchata. A cooler is built the same year as the service quarters in the garden behind the tower hollow bay. It allows a service fee at the table: fruits, drinks, sorbets, and ice decorative figurines.

Finally, a spacious garden for receptions, Estates of Brittany, concerts and dances, was built around 1760, known as the “nobles dining room”. On this occasion, the garden is reduced to its current configuration [P 3]. The hôtel de Blossac is then in its most complete configuration.

=== The life of the hôtel Blossac ===
Gabriel projects concerning City Hall of Rennes, in 1732, going towards the construction of a large ensemble, including a separate building south of the site for the governor of the province of Britain. The price of this construction, at the charge of the city, is considered prohibitive by the city council chaired by François Toussaint Rally du Baty and abandoned. However, to accommodate the worthy commander in chief of the province, the municipality is considering leasing the hotel Blossac for the sum of 6000 french livres per year (4000 livres from 1740 to 1754), a solution accepted by the widow Louis Gabriel La Bourdonnaye, who died in 1729. From 1732 to 1789, the hotel was Blossac the residence of the commander.

Archives states report a furniture and a domesticity recalling royal court. Indeed, as revealed by the inventories between 1740 and 1786, seventy people working at the hotel Blossac. There is a gatehouse, kitchen staff and service but also a Swiss, a baker and a butler, features a house of very high quality.

The facilities are luxurious, fitting a person of the importance of the military governor of the province. The salon doré (“Golden salon”), build by Brancas is an example with its marble, its gold leather, its windows and paintings. The walls, sober, are covered with curtains. Until 1750, the furniture remains characteristic of the reign of Louis XIV, probably due to lack of development of local craftsmen: no commode and most of the furniture is wooden and iron. The inventories show a whole simply furnished, but nevertheless indicate about twenty gaming tables.

Many commanders have live in the hotel, some having left their names for posterity through their facilities as Louis-Henri-de Brancas Forcalquier, Marshal of France, in office in 1750, which will develop the hotel on two levels: the ground floor and upstairs are identical and have the same type of housing. Brancas then occupies the ground floor, leaving his wife upstairs. A chapel was then present at the first floor, while rooms are moved to return the north west, to enjoy the morning light. A mezzanine floor is created above the corner room of to create a game room is during the occupation by the marshal that contemporary furniture from this period appear: commodes rococo style, with elements copper golden, toilet, caned seated and chairs in private parties, etc.

== Evolution of the architecture ==
1720, before the hôtel de Blossac

1728, construction of the hôtel de Blossac

1730

1732

1739

1745

1760, maximal extension .

After the Révolution

1860, new stables.

1990, during the restoration.

2010, now.
