= Hôtel Guimard (Art Nouveau) =

Town house in Paris, France

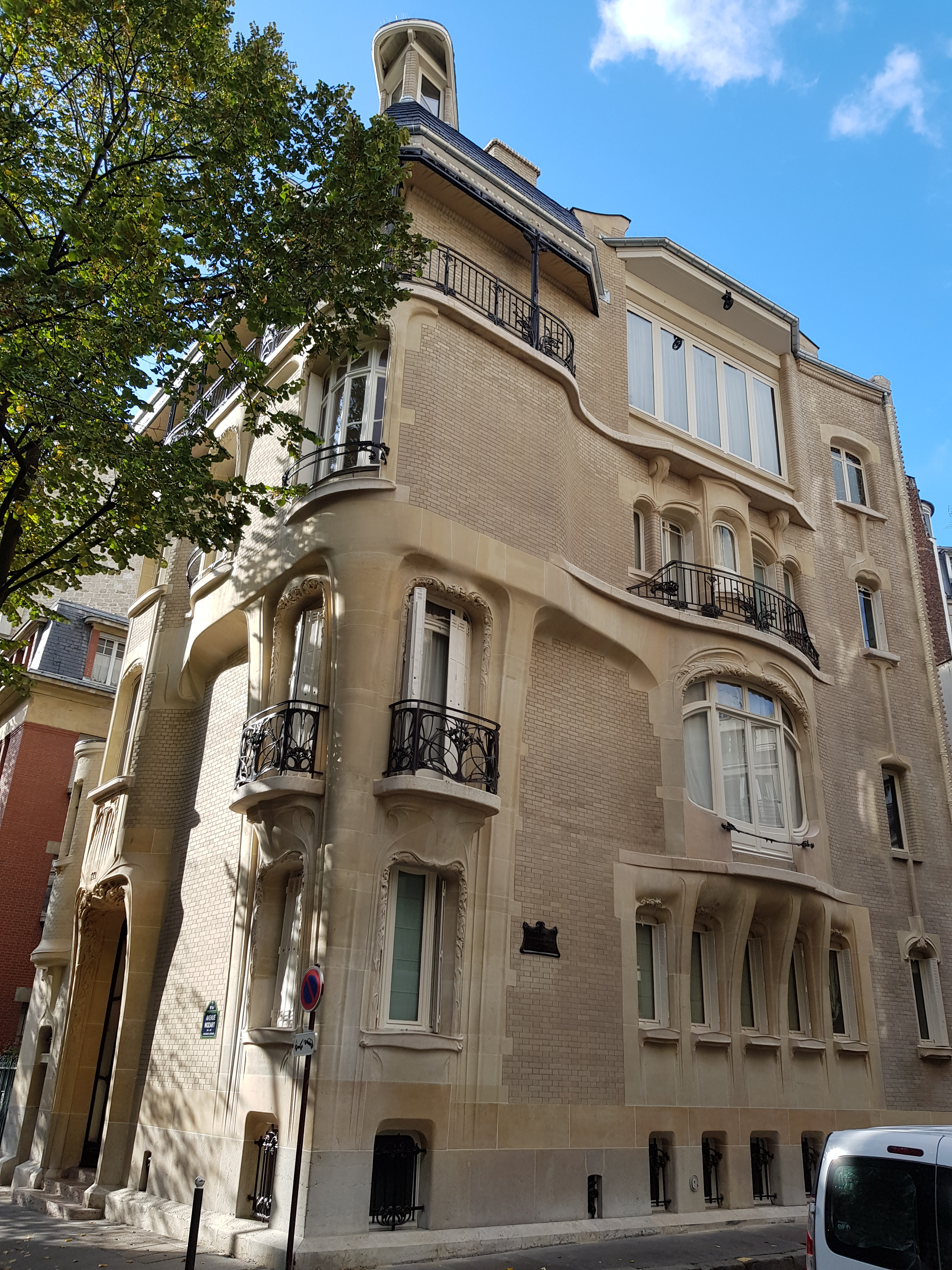
- Interactive map of the Hôtel Guimard area

General information
- Architectural style: Art Nouveau
- Location: Paris, France
- Coordinates: 48°50′59″N 2°15′59″E
- Construction started: 1909
- Completed: 1912
- Client: Hector Guimard

Design and construction
- Architect: Hector Guimard

Hôtel Guimard is an Art Nouveau town house built in 1909–1912 by Hector Guimard for use as his home and architectural studio, with a studio for his wife, the painter Adeline Oppenheim Guimard. It is considered one of the best surviving examples of his mature style. The house is located at 122 Avenue Mozart in the 16th arrondissement of Paris, France.

== Building ==
Avenue Mozart was a prestigious street with several mansions. Guimard built with cut stone as well as his characteristic brick, for which he here used a low-contrast shade, and although the fenestration is highly irregular (including a corner window and characteristic lanterns above a long balcony on the top floor), the ground-floor and top-floor windows on the main façade are symmetrical, so the building is more redolent of the eighteenth century than his earlier more or less fantastical houses. The small corner lot imposed a triangular shape on the house but made internal load-bearing walls unnecessary, and to save space, he did not include a main staircase, installing a lift instead. The interior layout differed on each floor: studios for his architectural business occupied the ground floor, reception rooms the floor above (including an oval salon and an oval dining room), living quarters the second floor and his wife's studio the top floor; the vast studio window has since been altered. Guimard also designed the interior decoration and the furniture, for which he used pear wood; the dining-room chairs feature interlaced initials 'O' and 'G', as does the table linen.

== History ==
Hôtel Guimard was built between 1909 and 1912, and from 1913 until they left France for the United States in 1937, housed both Guimard's practice and his wife Adeline Oppenheim Guimard's studio, as well as their living quarters; he had previously had his architectural business on the ground floor of his Castel Béranger, which was primarily flats.

After the architect's death in 1942, his wife offered the house and its contents to the French state. Her offer was refused, however, the building was converted into flats, and the fittings have been scattered. The dining room suite can today be seen at the Petit Palais; the bedroom at the Museum of Fine Arts of Lyon; the study at the Musée de l'École de Nancy; and other furnishings are at the Cooper Union and Museum of Modern Art in New York.

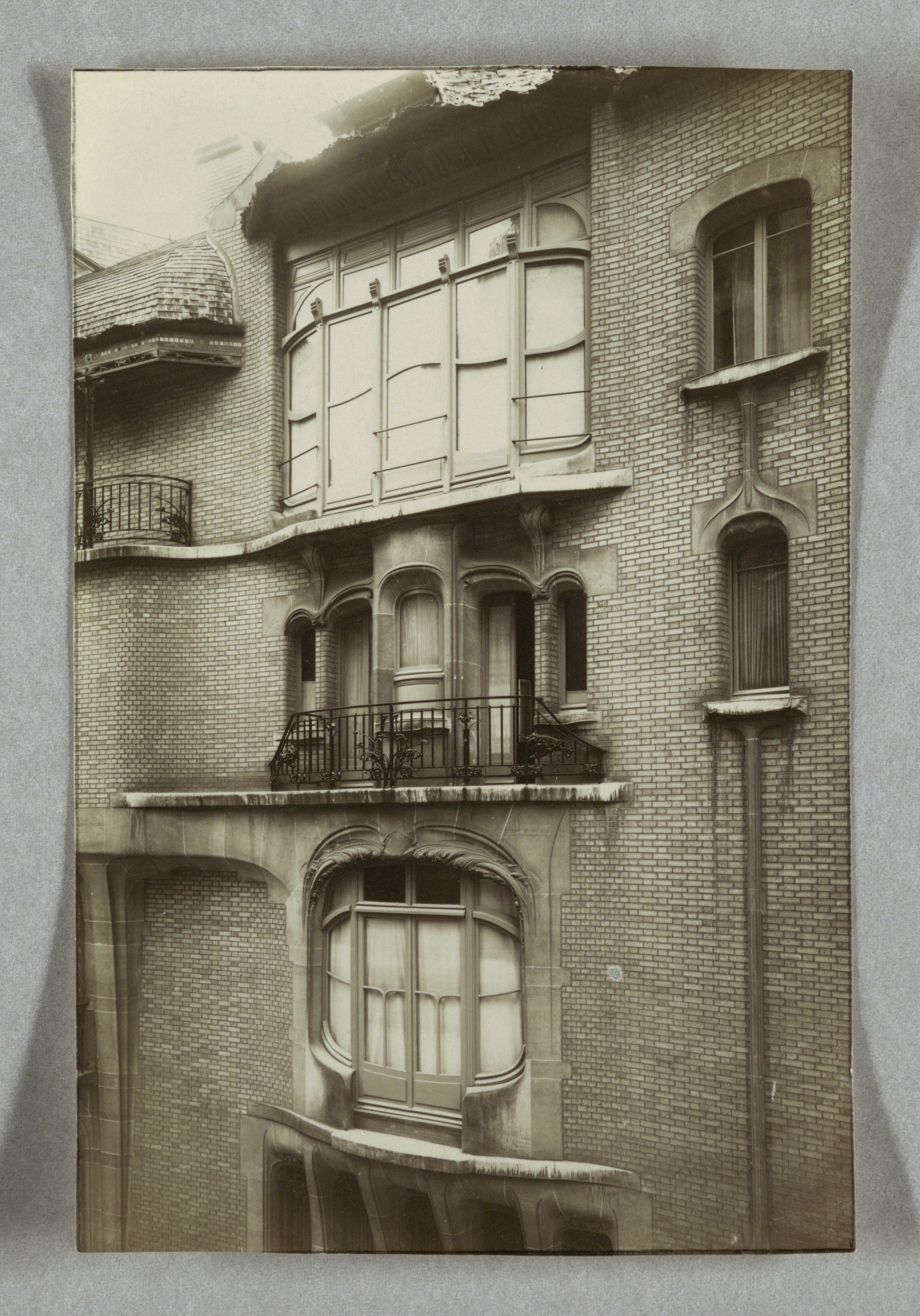
Early photograph of main façade with original windows

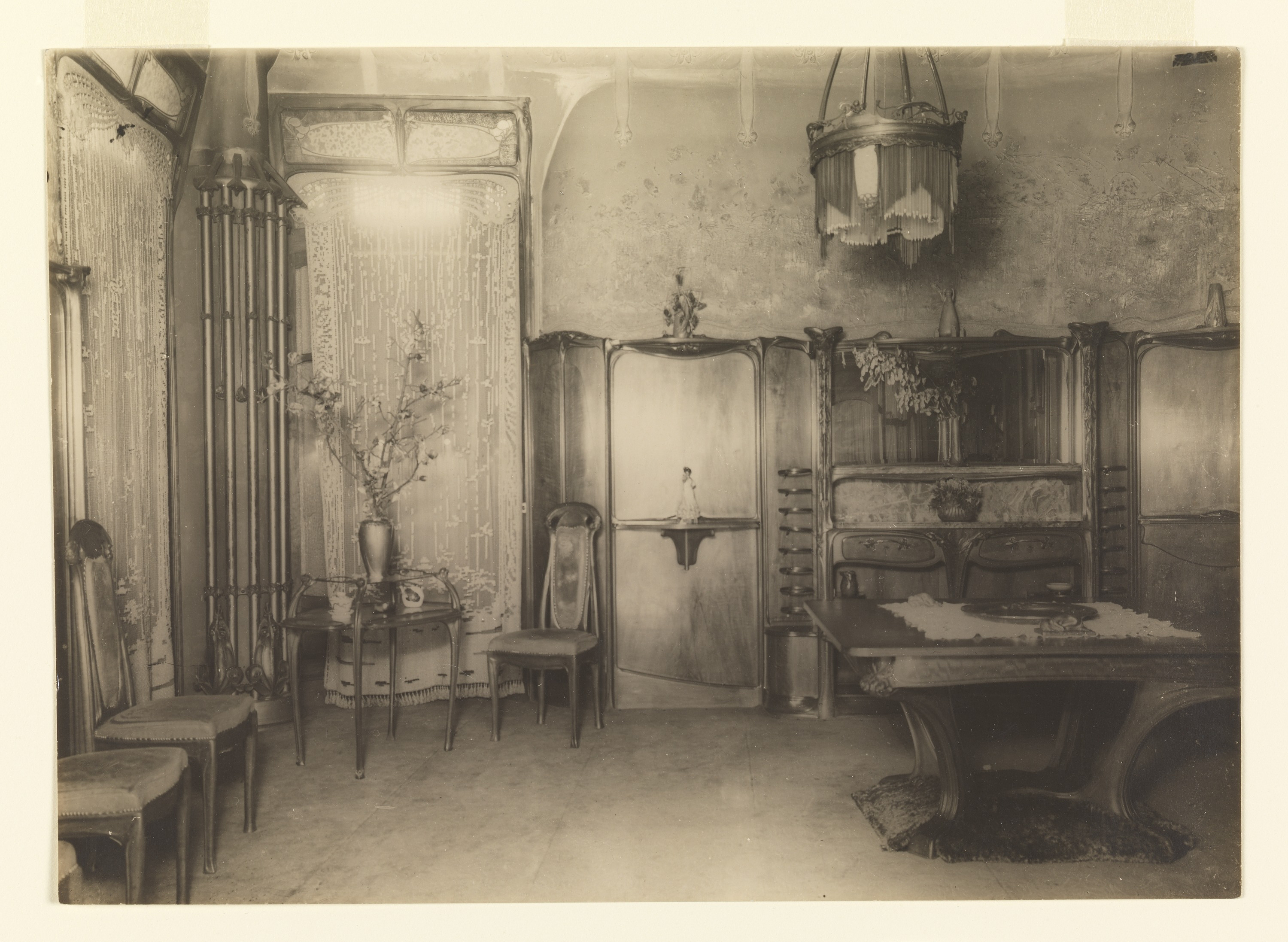
Early photograph of the dining room

== See also ==
- Concours de façades de la ville de Paris
