= Adeline Oppenheim Guimard =

American painter

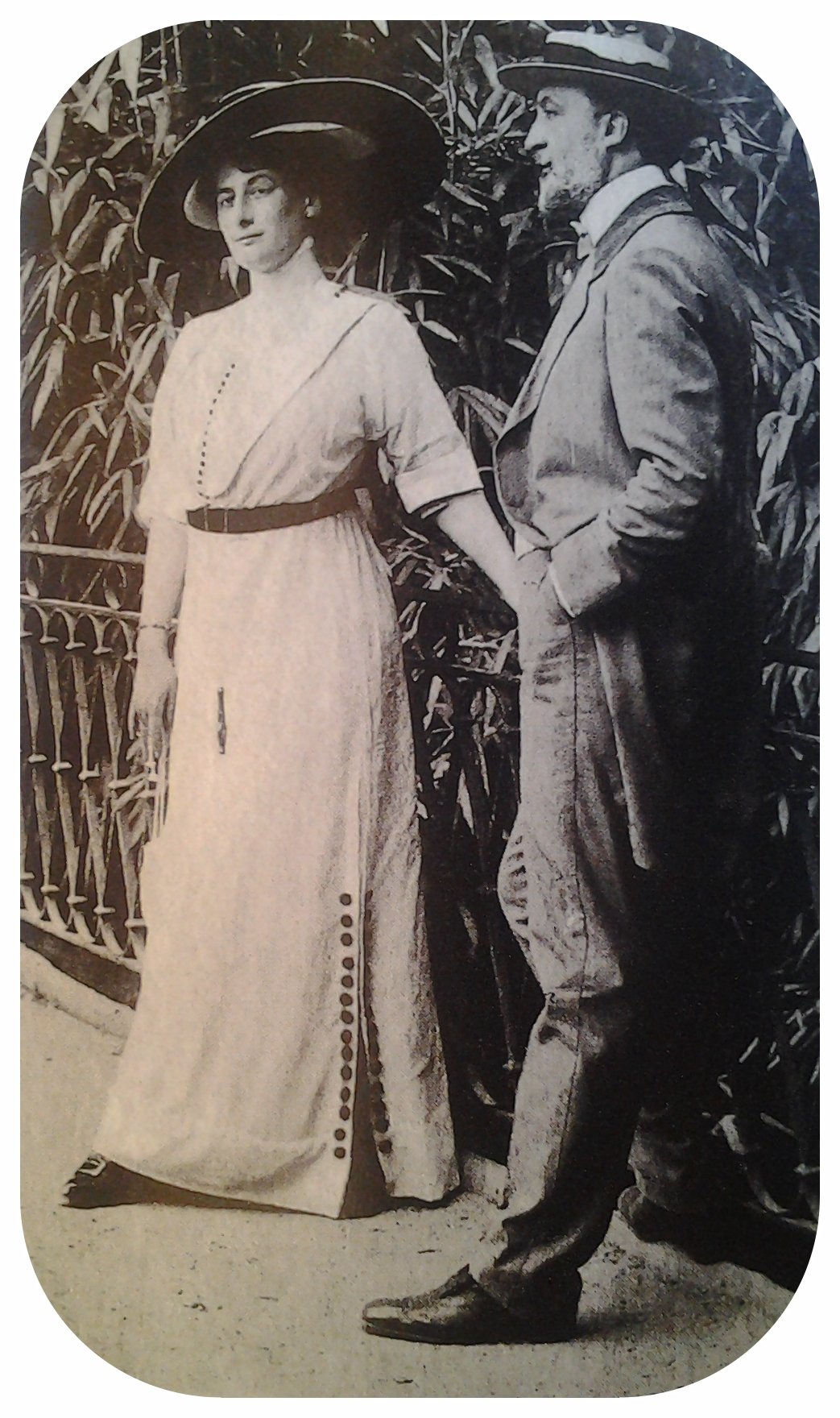
- Adeline Oppenheim Guimard with Hector Guimard
- Born: October 1, 1872; New York, United States
- Died: October 26, 1965 (aged 93); Orangetown, United States
- Known for: Painting
- Style: Portrait painting
- Spouse: Hector Guimard (1909–1942; his death)

Adeline Oppenheim Guimard (1 October 1872 – 26 October 1965) was an American painter noted for her portraits in gouache and colored crayons.

== Life and work ==
She trained in Paris, where she became a pupil of Albert Maignan, and her painting Romeo and Juliet was included in the 1905 book Women Painters of the World.

In 1909, she married the architect and designer Hector Guimard, and the couple moved into his Art Nouveau residence at Hôtel Guimard on avenue Mozart in Paris, decorated with furniture he designed himself.

She returned to live in New York City during World War II and after her husband's death in 1942 spent years collating their collection and associated papers. She donated many artifacts to various museums and the papers to the New York Public Library.

== Works ==
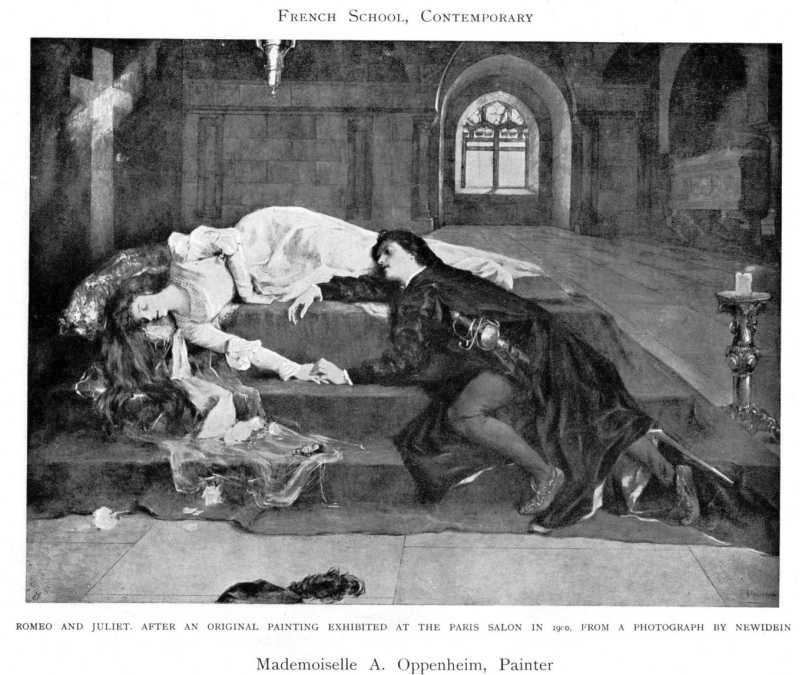
Romeo and Juliet, 1900

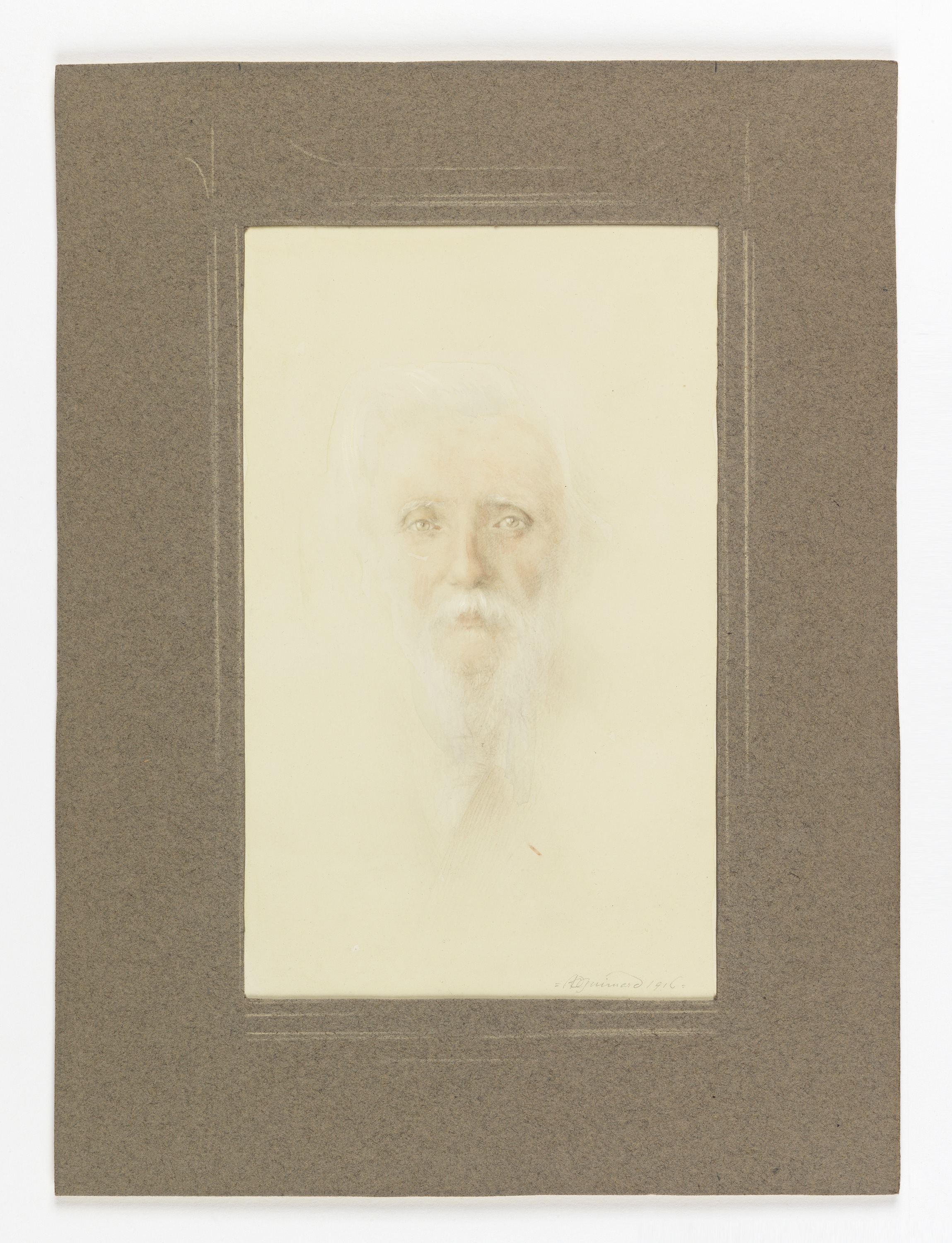
Portrait of a man with white hair and beard, 1916

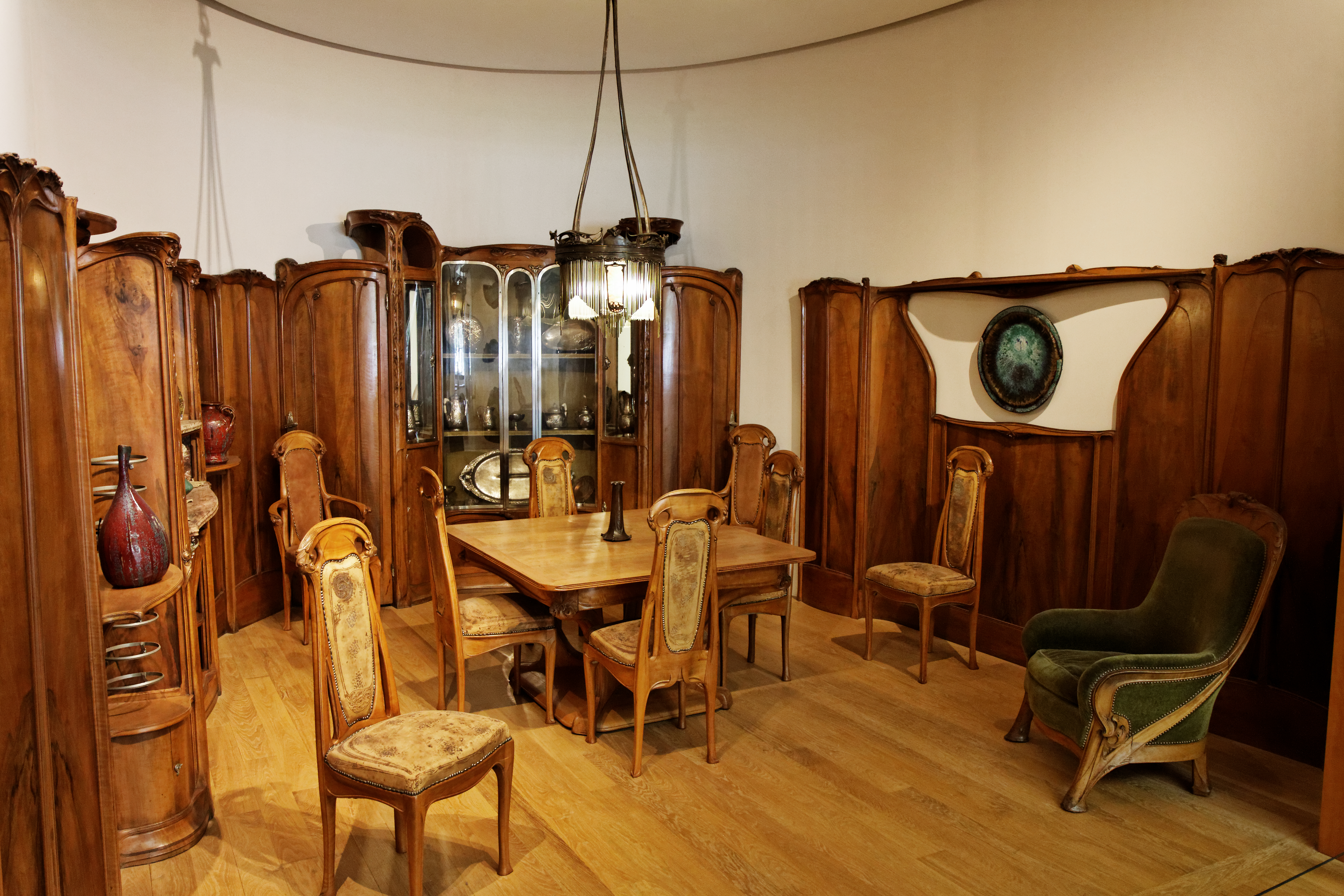
Dining room designed by her husband for Hôtel Guimard

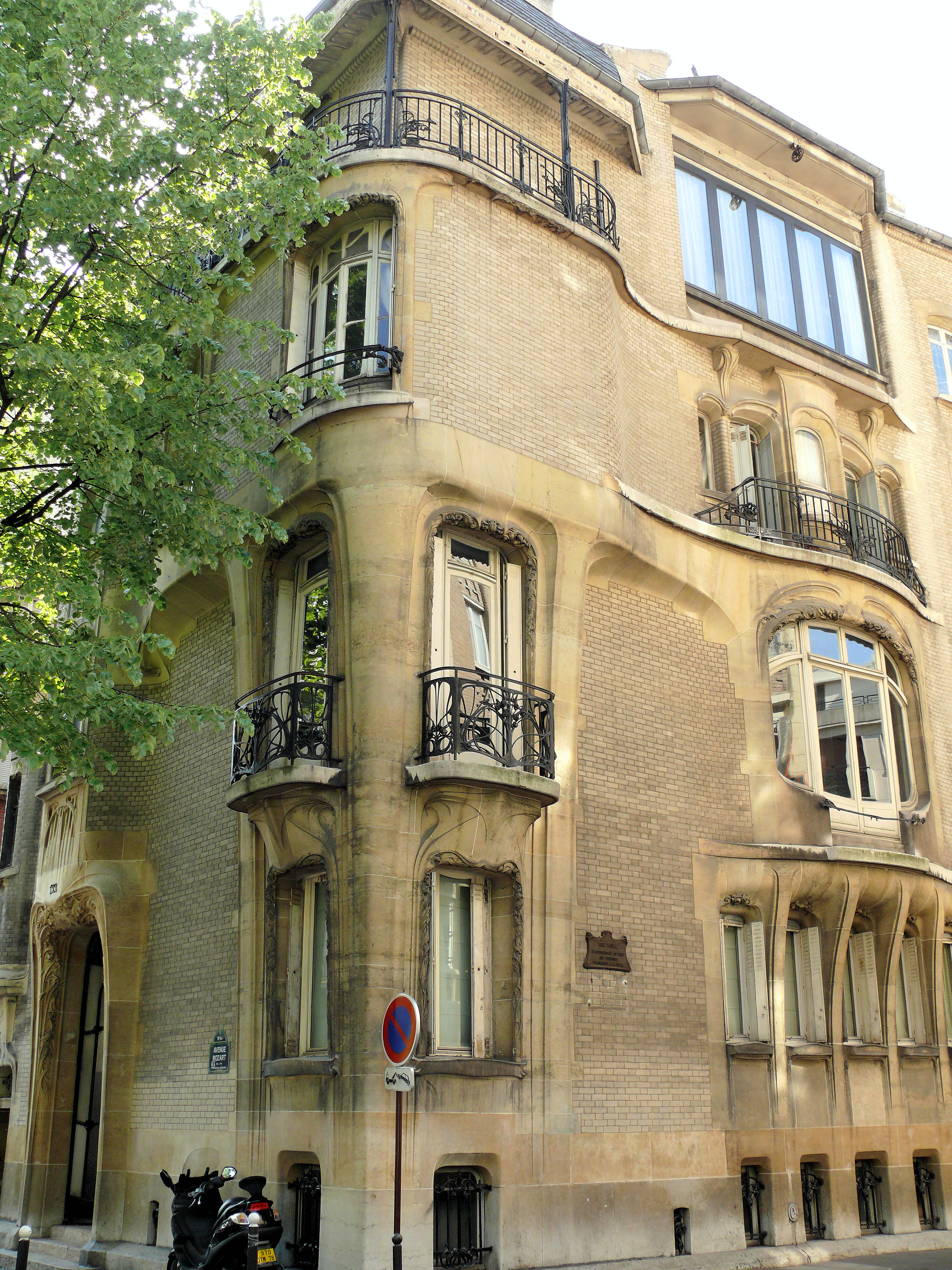
Hôtel Guimard
